

69001–69100 

|-bgcolor=#d6d6d6
| 69001 ||  || — || October 4, 2002 || Socorro || LINEAR || — || align=right | 5.1 km || 
|-id=002 bgcolor=#d6d6d6
| 69002 ||  || — || October 3, 2002 || Socorro || LINEAR || KOR || align=right | 3.0 km || 
|-id=003 bgcolor=#E9E9E9
| 69003 ||  || — || October 3, 2002 || Socorro || LINEAR || — || align=right | 4.0 km || 
|-id=004 bgcolor=#d6d6d6
| 69004 ||  || — || October 5, 2002 || Kitt Peak || Spacewatch || — || align=right | 8.9 km || 
|-id=005 bgcolor=#d6d6d6
| 69005 ||  || — || October 4, 2002 || Socorro || LINEAR || — || align=right | 7.1 km || 
|-id=006 bgcolor=#E9E9E9
| 69006 ||  || — || October 7, 2002 || Haleakala || NEAT || MAR || align=right | 2.6 km || 
|-id=007 bgcolor=#d6d6d6
| 69007 ||  || — || October 7, 2002 || Socorro || LINEAR || — || align=right | 7.0 km || 
|-id=008 bgcolor=#E9E9E9
| 69008 ||  || — || October 6, 2002 || Haleakala || NEAT || — || align=right | 2.9 km || 
|-id=009 bgcolor=#d6d6d6
| 69009 ||  || — || October 7, 2002 || Anderson Mesa || LONEOS || KAR || align=right | 2.9 km || 
|-id=010 bgcolor=#fefefe
| 69010 ||  || — || October 9, 2002 || Socorro || LINEAR || — || align=right | 2.2 km || 
|-id=011 bgcolor=#d6d6d6
| 69011 ||  || — || October 9, 2002 || Socorro || LINEAR || — || align=right | 6.4 km || 
|-id=012 bgcolor=#fefefe
| 69012 ||  || — || October 10, 2002 || Socorro || LINEAR || V || align=right | 1.3 km || 
|-id=013 bgcolor=#d6d6d6
| 69013 ||  || — || October 10, 2002 || Socorro || LINEAR || EOS || align=right | 5.1 km || 
|-id=014 bgcolor=#d6d6d6
| 69014 ||  || — || October 24, 2002 || Haleakala || NEAT || URS || align=right | 16 km || 
|-id=015 bgcolor=#E9E9E9
| 69015 ||  || — || October 31, 2002 || Socorro || LINEAR || — || align=right | 2.1 km || 
|-id=016 bgcolor=#fefefe
| 69016 ||  || — || October 31, 2002 || Anderson Mesa || LONEOS || — || align=right | 2.4 km || 
|-id=017 bgcolor=#E9E9E9
| 69017 ||  || — || October 31, 2002 || Socorro || LINEAR || — || align=right | 4.0 km || 
|-id=018 bgcolor=#E9E9E9
| 69018 ||  || — || November 5, 2002 || Fountain Hills || Fountain Hills Obs. || — || align=right | 9.5 km || 
|-id=019 bgcolor=#fefefe
| 69019 ||  || — || November 5, 2002 || Socorro || LINEAR || — || align=right | 3.4 km || 
|-id=020 bgcolor=#d6d6d6
| 69020 ||  || — || November 6, 2002 || Anderson Mesa || LONEOS || — || align=right | 8.0 km || 
|-id=021 bgcolor=#d6d6d6
| 69021 ||  || — || November 6, 2002 || Socorro || LINEAR || — || align=right | 7.7 km || 
|-id=022 bgcolor=#fefefe
| 69022 ||  || — || November 5, 2002 || Anderson Mesa || LONEOS || NYS || align=right | 1.8 km || 
|-id=023 bgcolor=#fefefe
| 69023 ||  || — || November 6, 2002 || Anderson Mesa || LONEOS || FLO || align=right | 1.9 km || 
|-id=024 bgcolor=#E9E9E9
| 69024 ||  || — || November 7, 2002 || Socorro || LINEAR || — || align=right | 3.5 km || 
|-id=025 bgcolor=#E9E9E9
| 69025 ||  || — || November 7, 2002 || Socorro || LINEAR || — || align=right | 2.4 km || 
|-id=026 bgcolor=#E9E9E9
| 69026 ||  || — || November 11, 2002 || Essen || Walter Hohmann Obs. || RAFslow || align=right | 6.7 km || 
|-id=027 bgcolor=#fefefe
| 69027 ||  || — || November 11, 2002 || Anderson Mesa || LONEOS || — || align=right | 1.5 km || 
|-id=028 bgcolor=#E9E9E9
| 69028 ||  || — || November 12, 2002 || Socorro || LINEAR || — || align=right | 2.6 km || 
|-id=029 bgcolor=#E9E9E9
| 69029 ||  || — || November 12, 2002 || Socorro || LINEAR || EUN || align=right | 3.0 km || 
|-id=030 bgcolor=#E9E9E9
| 69030 ||  || — || November 24, 2002 || Anderson Mesa || LONEOS || MAR || align=right | 2.7 km || 
|-id=031 bgcolor=#fefefe
| 69031 ||  || — || November 28, 2002 || Haleakala || NEAT || — || align=right | 2.2 km || 
|-id=032 bgcolor=#d6d6d6
| 69032 ||  || — || November 28, 2002 || Haleakala || NEAT || Tj (2.95) || align=right | 9.6 km || 
|-id=033 bgcolor=#fefefe
| 69033 ||  || — || December 1, 2002 || Socorro || LINEAR || NYS || align=right | 1.1 km || 
|-id=034 bgcolor=#fefefe
| 69034 ||  || — || December 2, 2002 || Socorro || LINEAR || — || align=right | 2.2 km || 
|-id=035 bgcolor=#E9E9E9
| 69035 ||  || — || December 6, 2002 || Socorro || LINEAR || — || align=right | 3.5 km || 
|-id=036 bgcolor=#d6d6d6
| 69036 ||  || — || December 6, 2002 || Socorro || LINEAR || — || align=right | 7.2 km || 
|-id=037 bgcolor=#E9E9E9
| 69037 ||  || — || December 9, 2002 || Kitt Peak || Spacewatch || — || align=right | 4.6 km || 
|-id=038 bgcolor=#E9E9E9
| 69038 ||  || — || December 7, 2002 || Palomar || NEAT || MAR || align=right | 2.9 km || 
|-id=039 bgcolor=#fefefe
| 69039 ||  || — || December 8, 2002 || Haleakala || NEAT || V || align=right | 2.0 km || 
|-id=040 bgcolor=#E9E9E9
| 69040 ||  || — || December 8, 2002 || Haleakala || NEAT || JUN || align=right | 3.1 km || 
|-id=041 bgcolor=#fefefe
| 69041 ||  || — || December 10, 2002 || Socorro || LINEAR || — || align=right | 3.3 km || 
|-id=042 bgcolor=#fefefe
| 69042 ||  || — || December 10, 2002 || Socorro || LINEAR || V || align=right | 1.5 km || 
|-id=043 bgcolor=#fefefe
| 69043 ||  || — || December 10, 2002 || Palomar || NEAT || — || align=right | 1.3 km || 
|-id=044 bgcolor=#E9E9E9
| 69044 ||  || — || December 10, 2002 || Palomar || NEAT || MIS || align=right | 4.0 km || 
|-id=045 bgcolor=#FA8072
| 69045 ||  || — || December 11, 2002 || Socorro || LINEAR || — || align=right | 4.4 km || 
|-id=046 bgcolor=#fefefe
| 69046 ||  || — || December 10, 2002 || Palomar || NEAT || — || align=right | 2.9 km || 
|-id=047 bgcolor=#E9E9E9
| 69047 ||  || — || December 12, 2002 || Haleakala || NEAT || EUN || align=right | 3.0 km || 
|-id=048 bgcolor=#fefefe
| 69048 ||  || — || December 10, 2002 || Socorro || LINEAR || — || align=right | 3.7 km || 
|-id=049 bgcolor=#E9E9E9
| 69049 ||  || — || December 11, 2002 || Socorro || LINEAR || MAR || align=right | 2.3 km || 
|-id=050 bgcolor=#E9E9E9
| 69050 ||  || — || December 11, 2002 || Palomar || NEAT || — || align=right | 3.1 km || 
|-id=051 bgcolor=#d6d6d6
| 69051 ||  || — || December 11, 2002 || Socorro || LINEAR || — || align=right | 5.7 km || 
|-id=052 bgcolor=#E9E9E9
| 69052 ||  || — || December 11, 2002 || Palomar || NEAT || — || align=right | 4.4 km || 
|-id=053 bgcolor=#E9E9E9
| 69053 ||  || — || December 27, 2002 || Anderson Mesa || LONEOS || — || align=right | 4.9 km || 
|-id=054 bgcolor=#d6d6d6
| 69054 ||  || — || December 28, 2002 || Anderson Mesa || LONEOS || EOS || align=right | 4.6 km || 
|-id=055 bgcolor=#d6d6d6
| 69055 ||  || — || December 28, 2002 || Anderson Mesa || LONEOS || — || align=right | 5.5 km || 
|-id=056 bgcolor=#fefefe
| 69056 ||  || — || December 28, 2002 || Kitt Peak || Spacewatch || CHL || align=right | 4.9 km || 
|-id=057 bgcolor=#E9E9E9
| 69057 ||  || — || December 31, 2002 || Socorro || LINEAR || — || align=right | 2.4 km || 
|-id=058 bgcolor=#fefefe
| 69058 ||  || — || December 31, 2002 || Kitt Peak || Spacewatch || V || align=right | 1.2 km || 
|-id=059 bgcolor=#fefefe
| 69059 ||  || — || December 31, 2002 || Socorro || LINEAR || — || align=right | 2.0 km || 
|-id=060 bgcolor=#d6d6d6
| 69060 ||  || — || December 31, 2002 || Socorro || LINEAR || THM || align=right | 5.8 km || 
|-id=061 bgcolor=#d6d6d6
| 69061 ||  || — || December 31, 2002 || Socorro || LINEAR || — || align=right | 4.4 km || 
|-id=062 bgcolor=#fefefe
| 69062 ||  || — || December 31, 2002 || Socorro || LINEAR || — || align=right | 2.5 km || 
|-id=063 bgcolor=#fefefe
| 69063 ||  || — || December 30, 2002 || Haleakala || NEAT || — || align=right | 2.4 km || 
|-id=064 bgcolor=#fefefe
| 69064 ||  || — || January 2, 2003 || Anderson Mesa || LONEOS || PHO || align=right | 3.6 km || 
|-id=065 bgcolor=#d6d6d6
| 69065 ||  || — || January 1, 2003 || Socorro || LINEAR || — || align=right | 6.5 km || 
|-id=066 bgcolor=#fefefe
| 69066 ||  || — || January 4, 2003 || Socorro || LINEAR || — || align=right | 1.4 km || 
|-id=067 bgcolor=#fefefe
| 69067 ||  || — || January 4, 2003 || Socorro || LINEAR || MAS || align=right | 1.6 km || 
|-id=068 bgcolor=#fefefe
| 69068 ||  || — || January 5, 2003 || Socorro || LINEAR || V || align=right | 2.0 km || 
|-id=069 bgcolor=#E9E9E9
| 69069 ||  || — || January 7, 2003 || Socorro || LINEAR || — || align=right | 3.6 km || 
|-id=070 bgcolor=#fefefe
| 69070 ||  || — || January 7, 2003 || Socorro || LINEAR || V || align=right | 2.2 km || 
|-id=071 bgcolor=#d6d6d6
| 69071 ||  || — || January 7, 2003 || Socorro || LINEAR || — || align=right | 4.6 km || 
|-id=072 bgcolor=#E9E9E9
| 69072 ||  || — || January 7, 2003 || Socorro || LINEAR || HNS || align=right | 2.0 km || 
|-id=073 bgcolor=#E9E9E9
| 69073 ||  || — || January 5, 2003 || Socorro || LINEAR || — || align=right | 4.6 km || 
|-id=074 bgcolor=#fefefe
| 69074 ||  || — || January 5, 2003 || Socorro || LINEAR || V || align=right | 2.0 km || 
|-id=075 bgcolor=#fefefe
| 69075 ||  || — || January 5, 2003 || Anderson Mesa || LONEOS || — || align=right | 2.4 km || 
|-id=076 bgcolor=#fefefe
| 69076 ||  || — || January 5, 2003 || Socorro || LINEAR || V || align=right | 1.6 km || 
|-id=077 bgcolor=#fefefe
| 69077 ||  || — || January 5, 2003 || Socorro || LINEAR || NYS || align=right data-sort-value="0.97" | 970 m || 
|-id=078 bgcolor=#fefefe
| 69078 ||  || — || January 5, 2003 || Socorro || LINEAR || FLO || align=right | 1.4 km || 
|-id=079 bgcolor=#fefefe
| 69079 ||  || — || January 7, 2003 || Socorro || LINEAR || NYS || align=right | 1.3 km || 
|-id=080 bgcolor=#E9E9E9
| 69080 ||  || — || January 7, 2003 || Socorro || LINEAR || BAR || align=right | 3.5 km || 
|-id=081 bgcolor=#fefefe
| 69081 ||  || — || January 7, 2003 || Socorro || LINEAR || — || align=right | 4.3 km || 
|-id=082 bgcolor=#fefefe
| 69082 ||  || — || January 10, 2003 || Socorro || LINEAR || — || align=right | 2.5 km || 
|-id=083 bgcolor=#d6d6d6
| 69083 ||  || — || January 10, 2003 || Socorro || LINEAR || LUT || align=right | 9.8 km || 
|-id=084 bgcolor=#fefefe
| 69084 || 2003 BB || — || January 16, 2003 || Palomar || NEAT || NYS || align=right | 1.7 km || 
|-id=085 bgcolor=#fefefe
| 69085 ||  || — || January 25, 2003 || Anderson Mesa || LONEOS || FLO || align=right | 1.3 km || 
|-id=086 bgcolor=#d6d6d6
| 69086 ||  || — || January 25, 2003 || Anderson Mesa || LONEOS || EOS || align=right | 5.5 km || 
|-id=087 bgcolor=#d6d6d6
| 69087 ||  || — || January 26, 2003 || Anderson Mesa || LONEOS || — || align=right | 6.7 km || 
|-id=088 bgcolor=#E9E9E9
| 69088 ||  || — || January 27, 2003 || Socorro || LINEAR || MAR || align=right | 3.1 km || 
|-id=089 bgcolor=#fefefe
| 69089 ||  || — || January 27, 2003 || Anderson Mesa || LONEOS || MAS || align=right | 1.6 km || 
|-id=090 bgcolor=#fefefe
| 69090 ||  || — || January 27, 2003 || Anderson Mesa || LONEOS || — || align=right | 2.9 km || 
|-id=091 bgcolor=#d6d6d6
| 69091 ||  || — || January 25, 2003 || Palomar || NEAT || — || align=right | 5.2 km || 
|-id=092 bgcolor=#E9E9E9
| 69092 ||  || — || January 26, 2003 || Palomar || NEAT || EUN || align=right | 2.5 km || 
|-id=093 bgcolor=#d6d6d6
| 69093 ||  || — || January 26, 2003 || Anderson Mesa || LONEOS || THM || align=right | 5.2 km || 
|-id=094 bgcolor=#d6d6d6
| 69094 ||  || — || January 26, 2003 || Haleakala || NEAT || — || align=right | 4.8 km || 
|-id=095 bgcolor=#fefefe
| 69095 ||  || — || January 27, 2003 || Socorro || LINEAR || NYS || align=right | 3.8 km || 
|-id=096 bgcolor=#E9E9E9
| 69096 ||  || — || January 27, 2003 || Palomar || NEAT || — || align=right | 3.6 km || 
|-id=097 bgcolor=#E9E9E9
| 69097 ||  || — || January 27, 2003 || Palomar || NEAT || — || align=right | 4.7 km || 
|-id=098 bgcolor=#fefefe
| 69098 ||  || — || January 27, 2003 || Socorro || LINEAR || — || align=right | 1.6 km || 
|-id=099 bgcolor=#E9E9E9
| 69099 ||  || — || January 28, 2003 || Socorro || LINEAR || — || align=right | 5.2 km || 
|-id=100 bgcolor=#E9E9E9
| 69100 ||  || — || January 28, 2003 || Socorro || LINEAR || — || align=right | 4.1 km || 
|}

69101–69200 

|-bgcolor=#d6d6d6
| 69101 ||  || — || January 28, 2003 || Palomar || NEAT || — || align=right | 5.7 km || 
|-id=102 bgcolor=#d6d6d6
| 69102 ||  || — || January 28, 2003 || Palomar || NEAT || — || align=right | 4.6 km || 
|-id=103 bgcolor=#d6d6d6
| 69103 ||  || — || January 31, 2003 || Anderson Mesa || LONEOS || — || align=right | 8.6 km || 
|-id=104 bgcolor=#fefefe
| 69104 ||  || — || January 31, 2003 || Socorro || LINEAR || — || align=right | 1.8 km || 
|-id=105 bgcolor=#d6d6d6
| 69105 ||  || — || January 27, 2003 || Socorro || LINEAR || — || align=right | 5.6 km || 
|-id=106 bgcolor=#fefefe
| 69106 ||  || — || February 2, 2003 || Socorro || LINEAR || V || align=right | 1.2 km || 
|-id=107 bgcolor=#E9E9E9
| 69107 ||  || — || February 1, 2003 || Socorro || LINEAR || RAF || align=right | 3.1 km || 
|-id=108 bgcolor=#d6d6d6
| 69108 ||  || — || February 1, 2003 || Socorro || LINEAR || ALA || align=right | 6.2 km || 
|-id=109 bgcolor=#fefefe
| 69109 ||  || — || February 1, 2003 || Kitt Peak || Spacewatch || NYS || align=right data-sort-value="0.98" | 980 m || 
|-id=110 bgcolor=#fefefe
| 69110 ||  || — || February 2, 2003 || Socorro || LINEAR || PHO || align=right | 2.1 km || 
|-id=111 bgcolor=#fefefe
| 69111 ||  || — || February 7, 2003 || Desert Eagle || W. K. Y. Yeung || — || align=right | 1.7 km || 
|-id=112 bgcolor=#E9E9E9
| 69112 ||  || — || February 21, 2003 || Palomar || NEAT || — || align=right | 2.7 km || 
|-id=113 bgcolor=#fefefe
| 69113 ||  || — || February 22, 2003 || Palomar || NEAT || — || align=right | 2.1 km || 
|-id=114 bgcolor=#d6d6d6
| 69114 ||  || — || February 26, 2003 || Haleakala || NEAT || ALA || align=right | 10 km || 
|-id=115 bgcolor=#d6d6d6
| 69115 ||  || — || February 22, 2003 || Palomar || NEAT || — || align=right | 3.8 km || 
|-id=116 bgcolor=#fefefe
| 69116 ||  || — || March 3, 2003 || Haleakala || NEAT || FLO || align=right | 1.2 km || 
|-id=117 bgcolor=#FA8072
| 69117 ||  || — || March 6, 2003 || Socorro || LINEAR || — || align=right | 2.1 km || 
|-id=118 bgcolor=#fefefe
| 69118 ||  || — || March 8, 2003 || Reedy Creek || J. Broughton || — || align=right | 1.8 km || 
|-id=119 bgcolor=#d6d6d6
| 69119 ||  || — || March 6, 2003 || Anderson Mesa || LONEOS || EUP || align=right | 8.5 km || 
|-id=120 bgcolor=#d6d6d6
| 69120 ||  || — || March 6, 2003 || Socorro || LINEAR || — || align=right | 5.6 km || 
|-id=121 bgcolor=#fefefe
| 69121 ||  || — || March 6, 2003 || Anderson Mesa || LONEOS || NYS || align=right | 1.6 km || 
|-id=122 bgcolor=#d6d6d6
| 69122 ||  || — || March 6, 2003 || Palomar || NEAT || — || align=right | 6.0 km || 
|-id=123 bgcolor=#E9E9E9
| 69123 ||  || — || March 8, 2003 || Socorro || LINEAR || EUN || align=right | 2.9 km || 
|-id=124 bgcolor=#d6d6d6
| 69124 ||  || — || March 8, 2003 || Socorro || LINEAR || — || align=right | 8.8 km || 
|-id=125 bgcolor=#fefefe
| 69125 ||  || — || March 10, 2003 || Kitt Peak || Spacewatch || — || align=right | 1.6 km || 
|-id=126 bgcolor=#d6d6d6
| 69126 ||  || — || March 7, 2003 || Goodricke-Pigott || R. A. Tucker || — || align=right | 6.6 km || 
|-id=127 bgcolor=#d6d6d6
| 69127 ||  || — || March 22, 2003 || Palomar || NEAT || — || align=right | 7.8 km || 
|-id=128 bgcolor=#d6d6d6
| 69128 ||  || — || March 23, 2003 || Haleakala || NEAT || — || align=right | 5.2 km || 
|-id=129 bgcolor=#E9E9E9
| 69129 ||  || — || March 24, 2003 || Kitt Peak || Spacewatch || — || align=right | 5.4 km || 
|-id=130 bgcolor=#fefefe
| 69130 ||  || — || March 23, 2003 || Haleakala || NEAT || — || align=right | 2.4 km || 
|-id=131 bgcolor=#fefefe
| 69131 ||  || — || March 24, 2003 || Kitt Peak || Spacewatch || — || align=right | 3.7 km || 
|-id=132 bgcolor=#E9E9E9
| 69132 ||  || — || March 24, 2003 || Kitt Peak || Spacewatch || — || align=right | 2.9 km || 
|-id=133 bgcolor=#d6d6d6
| 69133 ||  || — || March 25, 2003 || Palomar || NEAT || LUT || align=right | 10 km || 
|-id=134 bgcolor=#d6d6d6
| 69134 ||  || — || March 26, 2003 || Kitt Peak || Spacewatch || — || align=right | 3.9 km || 
|-id=135 bgcolor=#fefefe
| 69135 ||  || — || March 26, 2003 || Palomar || NEAT || — || align=right | 2.4 km || 
|-id=136 bgcolor=#d6d6d6
| 69136 ||  || — || March 28, 2003 || Kitt Peak || Spacewatch || — || align=right | 6.1 km || 
|-id=137 bgcolor=#fefefe
| 69137 ||  || — || March 28, 2003 || Palomar || NEAT || V || align=right | 1.4 km || 
|-id=138 bgcolor=#d6d6d6
| 69138 ||  || — || March 29, 2003 || Anderson Mesa || LONEOS || — || align=right | 8.2 km || 
|-id=139 bgcolor=#E9E9E9
| 69139 ||  || — || March 29, 2003 || Anderson Mesa || LONEOS || HNS || align=right | 2.2 km || 
|-id=140 bgcolor=#d6d6d6
| 69140 ||  || — || March 31, 2003 || Anderson Mesa || LONEOS || EOS || align=right | 4.3 km || 
|-id=141 bgcolor=#E9E9E9
| 69141 ||  || — || March 31, 2003 || Socorro || LINEAR || — || align=right | 6.5 km || 
|-id=142 bgcolor=#fefefe
| 69142 ||  || — || March 31, 2003 || Socorro || LINEAR || H || align=right | 1.6 km || 
|-id=143 bgcolor=#E9E9E9
| 69143 ||  || — || March 31, 2003 || Socorro || LINEAR || EUN || align=right | 4.2 km || 
|-id=144 bgcolor=#fefefe
| 69144 ||  || — || March 31, 2003 || Socorro || LINEAR || — || align=right | 4.3 km || 
|-id=145 bgcolor=#d6d6d6
| 69145 ||  || — || March 26, 2003 || Anderson Mesa || LONEOS || — || align=right | 3.8 km || 
|-id=146 bgcolor=#fefefe
| 69146 ||  || — || March 25, 2003 || Anderson Mesa || LONEOS || V || align=right | 1.9 km || 
|-id=147 bgcolor=#fefefe
| 69147 ||  || — || April 1, 2003 || Socorro || LINEAR || — || align=right | 3.4 km || 
|-id=148 bgcolor=#d6d6d6
| 69148 ||  || — || April 3, 2003 || Anderson Mesa || LONEOS || — || align=right | 5.8 km || 
|-id=149 bgcolor=#E9E9E9
| 69149 ||  || — || April 1, 2003 || Socorro || LINEAR || CLO || align=right | 5.4 km || 
|-id=150 bgcolor=#d6d6d6
| 69150 ||  || — || April 5, 2003 || Haleakala || NEAT || — || align=right | 6.7 km || 
|-id=151 bgcolor=#E9E9E9
| 69151 ||  || — || April 7, 2003 || Palomar || NEAT || — || align=right | 5.5 km || 
|-id=152 bgcolor=#E9E9E9
| 69152 ||  || — || April 4, 2003 || Haleakala || NEAT || — || align=right | 5.0 km || 
|-id=153 bgcolor=#fefefe
| 69153 ||  || — || April 27, 2003 || Anderson Mesa || LONEOS || V || align=right | 1.4 km || 
|-id=154 bgcolor=#d6d6d6
| 69154 ||  || — || April 28, 2003 || Kitt Peak || Spacewatch || — || align=right | 6.6 km || 
|-id=155 bgcolor=#d6d6d6
| 69155 ||  || — || April 30, 2003 || Haleakala || NEAT || LUT || align=right | 7.4 km || 
|-id=156 bgcolor=#fefefe
| 69156 ||  || — || May 1, 2003 || Socorro || LINEAR || — || align=right | 3.2 km || 
|-id=157 bgcolor=#d6d6d6
| 69157 ||  || — || May 3, 2003 || Reedy Creek || J. Broughton || BRA || align=right | 3.6 km || 
|-id=158 bgcolor=#d6d6d6
| 69158 ||  || — || May 5, 2003 || Anderson Mesa || LONEOS || — || align=right | 4.8 km || 
|-id=159 bgcolor=#E9E9E9
| 69159 Ivanking ||  ||  || May 7, 2003 || Catalina || CSS || JUN || align=right | 1.9 km || 
|-id=160 bgcolor=#fefefe
| 69160 || 2029 P-L || — || September 24, 1960 || Palomar || PLS || NYS || align=right | 1.7 km || 
|-id=161 bgcolor=#fefefe
| 69161 || 2203 P-L || — || September 24, 1960 || Palomar || PLS || V || align=right | 1.5 km || 
|-id=162 bgcolor=#E9E9E9
| 69162 || 2736 P-L || — || September 24, 1960 || Palomar || PLS || HOF || align=right | 4.6 km || 
|-id=163 bgcolor=#d6d6d6
| 69163 || 2744 P-L || — || September 24, 1960 || Palomar || PLS || — || align=right | 5.9 km || 
|-id=164 bgcolor=#d6d6d6
| 69164 || 3031 P-L || — || September 24, 1960 || Palomar || PLS || — || align=right | 8.0 km || 
|-id=165 bgcolor=#fefefe
| 69165 || 3044 P-L || — || September 24, 1960 || Palomar || PLS || — || align=right | 1.7 km || 
|-id=166 bgcolor=#d6d6d6
| 69166 || 3075 P-L || — || September 24, 1960 || Palomar || PLS || — || align=right | 2.8 km || 
|-id=167 bgcolor=#E9E9E9
| 69167 || 3082 P-L || — || September 24, 1960 || Palomar || PLS || — || align=right | 4.2 km || 
|-id=168 bgcolor=#d6d6d6
| 69168 || 3515 P-L || — || October 17, 1960 || Palomar || PLS || — || align=right | 6.8 km || 
|-id=169 bgcolor=#fefefe
| 69169 || 4066 P-L || — || September 24, 1960 || Palomar || PLS || — || align=right | 3.2 km || 
|-id=170 bgcolor=#fefefe
| 69170 || 4199 P-L || — || September 24, 1960 || Palomar || PLS || V || align=right | 1.2 km || 
|-id=171 bgcolor=#E9E9E9
| 69171 || 4230 P-L || — || September 24, 1960 || Palomar || PLS || JUN || align=right | 4.1 km || 
|-id=172 bgcolor=#d6d6d6
| 69172 || 4283 P-L || — || September 24, 1960 || Palomar || PLS || — || align=right | 5.2 km || 
|-id=173 bgcolor=#fefefe
| 69173 || 4304 P-L || — || September 24, 1960 || Palomar || PLS || — || align=right | 1.7 km || 
|-id=174 bgcolor=#d6d6d6
| 69174 || 4514 P-L || — || September 24, 1960 || Palomar || PLS || KAR || align=right | 2.2 km || 
|-id=175 bgcolor=#fefefe
| 69175 || 4550 P-L || — || September 24, 1960 || Palomar || PLS || — || align=right | 3.0 km || 
|-id=176 bgcolor=#d6d6d6
| 69176 || 4602 P-L || — || September 24, 1960 || Palomar || PLS || — || align=right | 8.2 km || 
|-id=177 bgcolor=#fefefe
| 69177 || 4618 P-L || — || September 24, 1960 || Palomar || PLS || NYS || align=right | 1.5 km || 
|-id=178 bgcolor=#fefefe
| 69178 || 4729 P-L || — || September 24, 1960 || Palomar || PLS || NYS || align=right | 3.1 km || 
|-id=179 bgcolor=#fefefe
| 69179 || 4756 P-L || — || September 24, 1960 || Palomar || PLS || — || align=right | 4.1 km || 
|-id=180 bgcolor=#d6d6d6
| 69180 || 4770 P-L || — || September 24, 1960 || Palomar || PLS || — || align=right | 6.5 km || 
|-id=181 bgcolor=#E9E9E9
| 69181 || 4821 P-L || — || September 24, 1960 || Palomar || PLS || — || align=right | 2.8 km || 
|-id=182 bgcolor=#E9E9E9
| 69182 || 4850 P-L || — || September 24, 1960 || Palomar || PLS || EUN || align=right | 2.7 km || 
|-id=183 bgcolor=#E9E9E9
| 69183 || 6638 P-L || — || September 24, 1960 || Palomar || PLS || — || align=right | 2.8 km || 
|-id=184 bgcolor=#fefefe
| 69184 || 6705 P-L || — || September 24, 1960 || Palomar || PLS || — || align=right | 2.3 km || 
|-id=185 bgcolor=#fefefe
| 69185 || 6739 P-L || — || September 24, 1960 || Palomar || PLS || V || align=right | 1.2 km || 
|-id=186 bgcolor=#E9E9E9
| 69186 || 6783 P-L || — || September 24, 1960 || Palomar || PLS || MRX || align=right | 2.2 km || 
|-id=187 bgcolor=#E9E9E9
| 69187 || 1178 T-1 || — || March 25, 1971 || Palomar || PLS || — || align=right | 4.7 km || 
|-id=188 bgcolor=#fefefe
| 69188 || 1258 T-1 || — || March 25, 1971 || Palomar || PLS || — || align=right | 1.8 km || 
|-id=189 bgcolor=#fefefe
| 69189 || 1263 T-1 || — || March 25, 1971 || Palomar || PLS || — || align=right | 5.1 km || 
|-id=190 bgcolor=#d6d6d6
| 69190 || 2027 T-1 || — || March 25, 1971 || Palomar || PLS || — || align=right | 9.0 km || 
|-id=191 bgcolor=#fefefe
| 69191 || 2143 T-1 || — || March 25, 1971 || Palomar || PLS || NYS || align=right | 1.5 km || 
|-id=192 bgcolor=#E9E9E9
| 69192 || 3172 T-1 || — || March 26, 1971 || Palomar || PLS || — || align=right | 5.6 km || 
|-id=193 bgcolor=#fefefe
| 69193 || 3326 T-1 || — || March 26, 1971 || Palomar || PLS || FLO || align=right | 1.4 km || 
|-id=194 bgcolor=#E9E9E9
| 69194 || 1118 T-2 || — || September 29, 1973 || Palomar || PLS || — || align=right | 3.6 km || 
|-id=195 bgcolor=#E9E9E9
| 69195 || 1164 T-2 || — || September 29, 1973 || Palomar || PLS || — || align=right | 3.6 km || 
|-id=196 bgcolor=#fefefe
| 69196 || 1216 T-2 || — || September 29, 1973 || Palomar || PLS || — || align=right | 1.3 km || 
|-id=197 bgcolor=#d6d6d6
| 69197 || 1238 T-2 || — || September 29, 1973 || Palomar || PLS || THM || align=right | 6.5 km || 
|-id=198 bgcolor=#fefefe
| 69198 || 1255 T-2 || — || September 29, 1973 || Palomar || PLS || NYS || align=right | 1.2 km || 
|-id=199 bgcolor=#d6d6d6
| 69199 || 1278 T-2 || — || September 29, 1973 || Palomar || PLS || EOS || align=right | 5.3 km || 
|-id=200 bgcolor=#fefefe
| 69200 || 1300 T-2 || — || September 29, 1973 || Palomar || PLS || NYS || align=right | 1.0 km || 
|}

69201–69300 

|-bgcolor=#fefefe
| 69201 || 1323 T-2 || — || September 29, 1973 || Palomar || PLS || — || align=right | 1.8 km || 
|-id=202 bgcolor=#fefefe
| 69202 || 2026 T-2 || — || September 29, 1973 || Palomar || PLS || — || align=right | 1.9 km || 
|-id=203 bgcolor=#fefefe
| 69203 || 2088 T-2 || — || September 29, 1973 || Palomar || PLS || FLO || align=right | 2.2 km || 
|-id=204 bgcolor=#fefefe
| 69204 || 2139 T-2 || — || September 29, 1973 || Palomar || PLS || NYS || align=right | 3.1 km || 
|-id=205 bgcolor=#fefefe
| 69205 || 2156 T-2 || — || September 29, 1973 || Palomar || PLS || — || align=right | 2.2 km || 
|-id=206 bgcolor=#fefefe
| 69206 || 2167 T-2 || — || September 29, 1973 || Palomar || PLS || FLO || align=right | 1.2 km || 
|-id=207 bgcolor=#fefefe
| 69207 || 3004 T-2 || — || September 30, 1973 || Palomar || PLS || MAS || align=right | 1.6 km || 
|-id=208 bgcolor=#E9E9E9
| 69208 || 3078 T-2 || — || September 30, 1973 || Palomar || PLS || — || align=right | 2.9 km || 
|-id=209 bgcolor=#fefefe
| 69209 || 3300 T-2 || — || September 30, 1973 || Palomar || PLS || V || align=right | 1.9 km || 
|-id=210 bgcolor=#E9E9E9
| 69210 || 3356 T-2 || — || September 25, 1973 || Palomar || PLS || — || align=right | 4.7 km || 
|-id=211 bgcolor=#fefefe
| 69211 || 4098 T-2 || — || September 29, 1973 || Palomar || PLS || — || align=right | 1.5 km || 
|-id=212 bgcolor=#fefefe
| 69212 || 4287 T-2 || — || September 29, 1973 || Palomar || PLS || FLO || align=right | 1.1 km || 
|-id=213 bgcolor=#d6d6d6
| 69213 || 4616 T-2 || — || September 30, 1973 || Palomar || PLS || — || align=right | 6.2 km || 
|-id=214 bgcolor=#d6d6d6
| 69214 || 5067 T-2 || — || September 25, 1973 || Palomar || PLS || — || align=right | 7.9 km || 
|-id=215 bgcolor=#E9E9E9
| 69215 || 5099 T-2 || — || September 25, 1973 || Palomar || PLS || — || align=right | 3.0 km || 
|-id=216 bgcolor=#d6d6d6
| 69216 || 1108 T-3 || — || October 17, 1977 || Palomar || PLS || — || align=right | 7.8 km || 
|-id=217 bgcolor=#d6d6d6
| 69217 || 2135 T-3 || — || October 16, 1977 || Palomar || PLS || — || align=right | 7.0 km || 
|-id=218 bgcolor=#fefefe
| 69218 || 2330 T-3 || — || October 16, 1977 || Palomar || PLS || NYS || align=right | 1.9 km || 
|-id=219 bgcolor=#E9E9E9
| 69219 || 2364 T-3 || — || October 16, 1977 || Palomar || PLS || GEF || align=right | 2.6 km || 
|-id=220 bgcolor=#d6d6d6
| 69220 || 3030 T-3 || — || October 16, 1977 || Palomar || PLS || THM || align=right | 5.7 km || 
|-id=221 bgcolor=#E9E9E9
| 69221 || 3528 T-3 || — || October 16, 1977 || Palomar || PLS || — || align=right | 4.1 km || 
|-id=222 bgcolor=#d6d6d6
| 69222 || 4210 T-3 || — || October 16, 1977 || Palomar || PLS || 7:4 || align=right | 11 km || 
|-id=223 bgcolor=#fefefe
| 69223 || 4331 T-3 || — || October 16, 1977 || Palomar || PLS || NYS || align=right | 3.7 km || 
|-id=224 bgcolor=#E9E9E9
| 69224 || 4388 T-3 || — || October 16, 1977 || Palomar || PLS || — || align=right | 3.4 km || 
|-id=225 bgcolor=#d6d6d6
| 69225 || 5043 T-3 || — || October 16, 1977 || Palomar || PLS || — || align=right | 7.7 km || 
|-id=226 bgcolor=#fefefe
| 69226 || 5129 T-3 || — || October 16, 1977 || Palomar || PLS || — || align=right | 2.0 km || 
|-id=227 bgcolor=#E9E9E9
| 69227 || 5139 T-3 || — || October 16, 1977 || Palomar || PLS || — || align=right | 3.5 km || 
|-id=228 bgcolor=#fefefe
| 69228 Kamerunberg || 5173 T-3 ||  || October 16, 1977 || Palomar || PLS || H || align=right | 1.1 km || 
|-id=229 bgcolor=#d6d6d6
| 69229 || 5188 T-3 || — || October 16, 1977 || Palomar || PLS || TIR || align=right | 3.1 km || 
|-id=230 bgcolor=#FFC2E0
| 69230 Hermes || 1937 UB ||  || October 28, 1937 || Heidelberg || K. Reinmuth || APO +1kmPHAmoon || align=right | 1.1 km || 
|-id=231 bgcolor=#E9E9E9
| 69231 Alettajacobs || 1972 FE ||  || March 16, 1972 || Palomar || T. Gehrels || — || align=right | 3.7 km || 
|-id=232 bgcolor=#fefefe
| 69232 ||  || — || October 27, 1978 || Palomar || C. M. Olmstead || — || align=right | 1.6 km || 
|-id=233 bgcolor=#fefefe
| 69233 ||  || — || October 27, 1978 || Palomar || C. M. Olmstead || NYS || align=right | 3.1 km || 
|-id=234 bgcolor=#E9E9E9
| 69234 ||  || — || November 1, 1978 || Caussols || K. Tomita || — || align=right | 7.5 km || 
|-id=235 bgcolor=#fefefe
| 69235 ||  || — || November 7, 1978 || Palomar || E. F. Helin, S. J. Bus || — || align=right | 1.8 km || 
|-id=236 bgcolor=#fefefe
| 69236 ||  || — || November 6, 1978 || Palomar || E. F. Helin, S. J. Bus || V || align=right | 1.9 km || 
|-id=237 bgcolor=#fefefe
| 69237 ||  || — || November 7, 1978 || Palomar || E. F. Helin, S. J. Bus || — || align=right | 3.4 km || 
|-id=238 bgcolor=#E9E9E9
| 69238 ||  || — || November 7, 1978 || Palomar || E. F. Helin, S. J. Bus || — || align=right | 3.5 km || 
|-id=239 bgcolor=#FA8072
| 69239 || 1978 XT || — || December 6, 1978 || Palomar || E. Bowell, A. Warnock || — || align=right | 1.6 km || 
|-id=240 bgcolor=#E9E9E9
| 69240 ||  || — || June 25, 1979 || Siding Spring || E. F. Helin, S. J. Bus || — || align=right | 5.7 km || 
|-id=241 bgcolor=#fefefe
| 69241 ||  || — || June 25, 1979 || Siding Spring || E. F. Helin, S. J. Bus || — || align=right | 1.3 km || 
|-id=242 bgcolor=#E9E9E9
| 69242 ||  || — || June 25, 1979 || Siding Spring || E. F. Helin, S. J. Bus || HOF || align=right | 6.6 km || 
|-id=243 bgcolor=#fefefe
| 69243 ||  || — || June 25, 1979 || Siding Spring || E. F. Helin, S. J. Bus || — || align=right | 1.5 km || 
|-id=244 bgcolor=#fefefe
| 69244 ||  || — || June 25, 1979 || Siding Spring || E. F. Helin, S. J. Bus || — || align=right | 2.2 km || 
|-id=245 bgcolor=#E9E9E9
| 69245 Persiceto || 1981 EO ||  || March 1, 1981 || La Silla || G. DeSanctis, H. Debehogne || — || align=right | 7.9 km || 
|-id=246 bgcolor=#E9E9E9
| 69246 ||  || — || March 2, 1981 || Siding Spring || S. J. Bus || — || align=right | 2.5 km || 
|-id=247 bgcolor=#fefefe
| 69247 ||  || — || March 1, 1981 || Siding Spring || S. J. Bus || — || align=right | 1.5 km || 
|-id=248 bgcolor=#E9E9E9
| 69248 ||  || — || March 2, 1981 || Siding Spring || S. J. Bus || — || align=right | 3.4 km || 
|-id=249 bgcolor=#E9E9E9
| 69249 ||  || — || March 2, 1981 || Siding Spring || S. J. Bus || EUN || align=right | 3.7 km || 
|-id=250 bgcolor=#fefefe
| 69250 ||  || — || March 7, 1981 || Siding Spring || S. J. Bus || — || align=right | 2.0 km || 
|-id=251 bgcolor=#fefefe
| 69251 ||  || — || March 1, 1981 || Siding Spring || S. J. Bus || FLO || align=right | 1.1 km || 
|-id=252 bgcolor=#fefefe
| 69252 ||  || — || March 2, 1981 || Siding Spring || S. J. Bus || FLO || align=right | 1.7 km || 
|-id=253 bgcolor=#fefefe
| 69253 ||  || — || March 2, 1981 || Siding Spring || S. J. Bus || V || align=right | 1.3 km || 
|-id=254 bgcolor=#E9E9E9
| 69254 ||  || — || March 1, 1981 || Siding Spring || S. J. Bus || — || align=right | 2.1 km || 
|-id=255 bgcolor=#fefefe
| 69255 ||  || — || March 2, 1981 || Siding Spring || S. J. Bus || NYS || align=right | 1.5 km || 
|-id=256 bgcolor=#fefefe
| 69256 ||  || — || March 2, 1981 || Siding Spring || S. J. Bus || FLO || align=right | 1.3 km || 
|-id=257 bgcolor=#E9E9E9
| 69257 ||  || — || March 2, 1981 || Siding Spring || S. J. Bus || — || align=right | 3.8 km || 
|-id=258 bgcolor=#d6d6d6
| 69258 ||  || — || October 24, 1981 || Palomar || S. J. Bus || — || align=right | 4.8 km || 
|-id=259 bgcolor=#E9E9E9
| 69259 Savostyanov ||  ||  || September 18, 1982 || Nauchnyj || N. S. Chernykh || — || align=right | 3.0 km || 
|-id=260 bgcolor=#FA8072
| 69260 Tonyjudt || 1982 TJ ||  || October 13, 1982 || Anderson Mesa || E. Bowell || — || align=right | 2.9 km || 
|-id=261 bgcolor=#E9E9E9
| 69261 Philaret ||  ||  || December 23, 1982 || Nauchnyj || L. G. Karachkina || — || align=right | 7.1 km || 
|-id=262 bgcolor=#fefefe
| 69262 ||  || — || August 12, 1986 || Nauchnyj || L. V. Zhuravleva || FLO || align=right | 2.4 km || 
|-id=263 bgcolor=#fefefe
| 69263 Big Ben ||  ||  || January 29, 1987 || La Silla || E. W. Elst || NYS || align=right | 2.3 km || 
|-id=264 bgcolor=#fefefe
| 69264 Nebra ||  ||  || August 14, 1988 || Tautenburg Observatory || F. Börngen || NYS || align=right | 1.6 km || 
|-id=265 bgcolor=#fefefe
| 69265 ||  || — || September 5, 1988 || La Silla || H. Debehogne || MAS || align=right | 1.6 km || 
|-id=266 bgcolor=#fefefe
| 69266 ||  || — || September 6, 1988 || La Silla || H. Debehogne || ERI || align=right | 5.9 km || 
|-id=267 bgcolor=#fefefe
| 69267 ||  || — || September 7, 1988 || La Silla || H. Debehogne || V || align=right | 3.3 km || 
|-id=268 bgcolor=#fefefe
| 69268 ||  || — || September 16, 1988 || Cerro Tololo || S. J. Bus || — || align=right | 2.0 km || 
|-id=269 bgcolor=#fefefe
| 69269 ||  || — || November 3, 1988 || Brorfelde || P. Jensen || CHL || align=right | 4.3 km || 
|-id=270 bgcolor=#fefefe
| 69270 || 1989 BB || — || January 29, 1989 || Kitami || K. Endate, K. Watanabe || — || align=right | 6.0 km || 
|-id=271 bgcolor=#E9E9E9
| 69271 ||  || — || April 3, 1989 || La Silla || E. W. Elst || — || align=right | 3.6 km || 
|-id=272 bgcolor=#fefefe
| 69272 ||  || — || September 26, 1989 || La Silla || E. W. Elst || — || align=right | 2.1 km || 
|-id=273 bgcolor=#E9E9E9
| 69273 ||  || — || October 4, 1989 || Stakenbridge || B. G. W. Manning || — || align=right | 4.6 km || 
|-id=274 bgcolor=#FA8072
| 69274 ||  || — || October 29, 1989 || Gekko || Y. Oshima || — || align=right | 2.2 km || 
|-id=275 bgcolor=#E9E9E9
| 69275 Wiesenthal ||  ||  || November 28, 1989 || Tautenburg Observatory || F. Börngen || DOR || align=right | 5.9 km || 
|-id=276 bgcolor=#fefefe
| 69276 ||  || — || December 31, 1989 || Haute Provence || E. W. Elst || — || align=right | 2.3 km || 
|-id=277 bgcolor=#fefefe
| 69277 ||  || — || March 2, 1990 || La Silla || E. W. Elst || — || align=right | 2.2 km || 
|-id=278 bgcolor=#fefefe
| 69278 ||  || — || March 2, 1990 || La Silla || E. W. Elst || — || align=right | 2.7 km || 
|-id=279 bgcolor=#fefefe
| 69279 ||  || — || March 2, 1990 || La Silla || E. W. Elst || — || align=right | 2.3 km || 
|-id=280 bgcolor=#E9E9E9
| 69280 ||  || — || September 13, 1990 || La Silla || H. Debehogne || — || align=right | 3.1 km || 
|-id=281 bgcolor=#E9E9E9
| 69281 ||  || — || September 22, 1990 || La Silla || E. W. Elst || — || align=right | 3.4 km || 
|-id=282 bgcolor=#E9E9E9
| 69282 ||  || — || September 22, 1990 || La Silla || E. W. Elst || MAR || align=right | 5.0 km || 
|-id=283 bgcolor=#E9E9E9
| 69283 ||  || — || September 22, 1990 || La Silla || E. W. Elst || — || align=right | 4.5 km || 
|-id=284 bgcolor=#fefefe
| 69284 ||  || — || September 22, 1990 || La Silla || E. W. Elst || — || align=right | 1.7 km || 
|-id=285 bgcolor=#E9E9E9
| 69285 ||  || — || September 25, 1990 || La Silla || H. Debehogne || — || align=right | 3.7 km || 
|-id=286 bgcolor=#E9E9E9
| 69286 von Liebig ||  ||  || October 10, 1990 || Tautenburg Observatory || F. Börngen, L. D. Schmadel || — || align=right | 3.0 km || 
|-id=287 bgcolor=#fefefe
| 69287 Günthereichhorn ||  ||  || October 10, 1990 || Tautenburg Observatory || L. D. Schmadel, F. Börngen || FLO || align=right | 1.1 km || 
|-id=288 bgcolor=#E9E9E9
| 69288 Berlioz ||  ||  || October 11, 1990 || Tautenburg Observatory || F. Börngen, L. D. Schmadel || — || align=right | 6.3 km || 
|-id=289 bgcolor=#fefefe
| 69289 ||  || — || October 24, 1990 || Kitt Peak || Spacewatch || — || align=right | 1.4 km || 
|-id=290 bgcolor=#fefefe
| 69290 ||  || — || October 16, 1990 || La Silla || E. W. Elst || — || align=right | 1.8 km || 
|-id=291 bgcolor=#E9E9E9
| 69291 ||  || — || November 18, 1990 || La Silla || E. W. Elst || HNS || align=right | 4.3 km || 
|-id=292 bgcolor=#E9E9E9
| 69292 ||  || — || November 18, 1990 || La Silla || E. W. Elst || EUN || align=right | 4.0 km || 
|-id=293 bgcolor=#d6d6d6
| 69293 ||  || — || April 10, 1991 || La Silla || E. W. Elst || — || align=right | 5.9 km || 
|-id=294 bgcolor=#d6d6d6
| 69294 ||  || — || August 13, 1991 || Palomar || E. F. Helin || EUP || align=right | 16 km || 
|-id=295 bgcolor=#d6d6d6
| 69295 Stecklum ||  ||  || October 2, 1991 || Tautenburg Observatory || L. D. Schmadel, F. Börngen || MEL || align=right | 8.3 km || 
|-id=296 bgcolor=#E9E9E9
| 69296 ||  || — || January 29, 1992 || Kitt Peak || Spacewatch || — || align=right | 3.4 km || 
|-id=297 bgcolor=#E9E9E9
| 69297 ||  || — || February 29, 1992 || La Silla || UESAC || — || align=right | 5.1 km || 
|-id=298 bgcolor=#fefefe
| 69298 ||  || — || February 29, 1992 || La Silla || UESAC || — || align=right | 4.0 km || 
|-id=299 bgcolor=#E9E9E9
| 69299 ||  || — || March 1, 1992 || La Silla || UESAC || ADE || align=right | 5.5 km || 
|-id=300 bgcolor=#E9E9E9
| 69300 ||  || — || March 1, 1992 || La Silla || UESAC || NEM || align=right | 3.9 km || 
|}

69301–69400 

|-bgcolor=#d6d6d6
| 69301 ||  || — || March 2, 1992 || La Silla || UESAC || HYG || align=right | 5.8 km || 
|-id=302 bgcolor=#d6d6d6
| 69302 ||  || — || March 6, 1992 || La Silla || UESAC || 3:2 || align=right | 12 km || 
|-id=303 bgcolor=#E9E9E9
| 69303 ||  || — || March 2, 1992 || La Silla || UESAC || — || align=right | 6.0 km || 
|-id=304 bgcolor=#fefefe
| 69304 ||  || — || March 2, 1992 || La Silla || UESAC || — || align=right | 1.9 km || 
|-id=305 bgcolor=#E9E9E9
| 69305 ||  || — || March 2, 1992 || La Silla || UESAC || — || align=right | 2.8 km || 
|-id=306 bgcolor=#E9E9E9
| 69306 ||  || — || March 3, 1992 || La Silla || UESAC || MRX || align=right | 2.1 km || 
|-id=307 bgcolor=#FA8072
| 69307 || 1992 ON || — || July 28, 1992 || Siding Spring || R. H. McNaught || H || align=right | 1.6 km || 
|-id=308 bgcolor=#fefefe
| 69308 ||  || — || August 8, 1992 || Caussols || E. W. Elst || — || align=right | 2.7 km || 
|-id=309 bgcolor=#fefefe
| 69309 ||  || — || August 8, 1992 || Caussols || E. W. Elst || — || align=right | 1.3 km || 
|-id=310 bgcolor=#fefefe
| 69310 ||  || — || August 8, 1992 || Caussols || E. W. Elst || FLO || align=right | 1.9 km || 
|-id=311 bgcolor=#FA8072
| 69311 Russ || 1992 QC ||  || August 21, 1992 || Siding Spring || D. I. Steel || — || align=right | 4.3 km || 
|-id=312 bgcolor=#fefefe
| 69312 Rogerbacon ||  ||  || September 24, 1992 || Tautenburg Observatory || F. Börngen, L. D. Schmadel || V || align=right | 1.9 km || 
|-id=313 bgcolor=#fefefe
| 69313 ||  || — || September 22, 1992 || La Silla || E. W. Elst || — || align=right | 1.6 km || 
|-id=314 bgcolor=#fefefe
| 69314 ||  || — || September 22, 1992 || La Silla || E. W. Elst || V || align=right | 1.8 km || 
|-id=315 bgcolor=#fefefe
| 69315 ||  || — || October 20, 1992 || Palomar || H. E. Holt || PHO || align=right | 4.5 km || 
|-id=316 bgcolor=#E9E9E9
| 69316 ||  || — || March 17, 1993 || La Silla || UESAC || — || align=right | 2.4 km || 
|-id=317 bgcolor=#E9E9E9
| 69317 ||  || — || March 17, 1993 || La Silla || UESAC || slow || align=right | 3.2 km || 
|-id=318 bgcolor=#E9E9E9
| 69318 ||  || — || March 19, 1993 || La Silla || UESAC || — || align=right | 3.4 km || 
|-id=319 bgcolor=#E9E9E9
| 69319 ||  || — || March 21, 1993 || La Silla || UESAC || EUN || align=right | 3.1 km || 
|-id=320 bgcolor=#E9E9E9
| 69320 ||  || — || March 21, 1993 || La Silla || UESAC || — || align=right | 4.1 km || 
|-id=321 bgcolor=#E9E9E9
| 69321 ||  || — || March 19, 1993 || La Silla || UESAC || — || align=right | 2.8 km || 
|-id=322 bgcolor=#E9E9E9
| 69322 ||  || — || March 19, 1993 || La Silla || UESAC || — || align=right | 4.2 km || 
|-id=323 bgcolor=#E9E9E9
| 69323 ||  || — || March 19, 1993 || La Silla || UESAC || EUN || align=right | 4.4 km || 
|-id=324 bgcolor=#E9E9E9
| 69324 ||  || — || March 19, 1993 || La Silla || UESAC || — || align=right | 2.8 km || 
|-id=325 bgcolor=#E9E9E9
| 69325 ||  || — || March 19, 1993 || La Silla || UESAC || — || align=right | 2.3 km || 
|-id=326 bgcolor=#E9E9E9
| 69326 ||  || — || March 19, 1993 || La Silla || UESAC || — || align=right | 3.0 km || 
|-id=327 bgcolor=#E9E9E9
| 69327 ||  || — || March 19, 1993 || La Silla || UESAC || — || align=right | 2.6 km || 
|-id=328 bgcolor=#E9E9E9
| 69328 ||  || — || March 18, 1993 || La Silla || UESAC || — || align=right | 2.3 km || 
|-id=329 bgcolor=#E9E9E9
| 69329 ||  || — || April 15, 1993 || Palomar || H. E. Holt || — || align=right | 4.4 km || 
|-id=330 bgcolor=#E9E9E9
| 69330 ||  || — || April 19, 1993 || Kitt Peak || Spacewatch || — || align=right | 2.2 km || 
|-id=331 bgcolor=#E9E9E9
| 69331 ||  || — || June 13, 1993 || Siding Spring || R. H. McNaught || EUN || align=right | 3.5 km || 
|-id=332 bgcolor=#E9E9E9
| 69332 ||  || — || June 13, 1993 || Siding Spring || R. H. McNaught || JUN || align=right | 3.8 km || 
|-id=333 bgcolor=#E9E9E9
| 69333 ||  || — || July 20, 1993 || La Silla || E. W. Elst || — || align=right | 6.6 km || 
|-id=334 bgcolor=#fefefe
| 69334 ||  || — || August 14, 1993 || Kitt Peak || Spacewatch || NYS || align=right data-sort-value="0.79" | 790 m || 
|-id=335 bgcolor=#d6d6d6
| 69335 ||  || — || September 15, 1993 || La Silla || E. W. Elst || KOR || align=right | 2.9 km || 
|-id=336 bgcolor=#fefefe
| 69336 || 1993 SJ || — || September 16, 1993 || Kitt Peak || Spacewatch || — || align=right | 1.2 km || 
|-id=337 bgcolor=#fefefe
| 69337 ||  || — || September 17, 1993 || La Silla || E. W. Elst || — || align=right | 2.0 km || 
|-id=338 bgcolor=#fefefe
| 69338 ||  || — || October 9, 1993 || Kitt Peak || Spacewatch || — || align=right | 4.1 km || 
|-id=339 bgcolor=#fefefe
| 69339 ||  || — || October 15, 1993 || Kitt Peak || Spacewatch || — || align=right | 1.7 km || 
|-id=340 bgcolor=#fefefe
| 69340 ||  || — || October 9, 1993 || La Silla || E. W. Elst || — || align=right | 1.9 km || 
|-id=341 bgcolor=#d6d6d6
| 69341 ||  || — || October 9, 1993 || La Silla || E. W. Elst || — || align=right | 5.1 km || 
|-id=342 bgcolor=#d6d6d6
| 69342 ||  || — || October 9, 1993 || La Silla || E. W. Elst || — || align=right | 4.0 km || 
|-id=343 bgcolor=#fefefe
| 69343 ||  || — || October 9, 1993 || La Silla || E. W. Elst || V || align=right | 1.1 km || 
|-id=344 bgcolor=#fefefe
| 69344 ||  || — || October 9, 1993 || La Silla || E. W. Elst || — || align=right | 1.8 km || 
|-id=345 bgcolor=#fefefe
| 69345 ||  || — || October 9, 1993 || La Silla || E. W. Elst || FLO || align=right | 1.1 km || 
|-id=346 bgcolor=#fefefe
| 69346 ||  || — || October 9, 1993 || La Silla || E. W. Elst || — || align=right | 1.5 km || 
|-id=347 bgcolor=#d6d6d6
| 69347 ||  || — || October 9, 1993 || La Silla || E. W. Elst || — || align=right | 6.3 km || 
|-id=348 bgcolor=#fefefe
| 69348 ||  || — || October 20, 1993 || La Silla || E. W. Elst || V || align=right | 1.2 km || 
|-id=349 bgcolor=#fefefe
| 69349 || 1993 VU || — || November 9, 1993 || Palomar || E. F. Helin || PHO || align=right | 2.2 km || 
|-id=350 bgcolor=#FA8072
| 69350 || 1993 YP || — || December 17, 1993 || Siding Spring || G. J. Garradd || H || align=right | 2.5 km || 
|-id=351 bgcolor=#fefefe
| 69351 ||  || — || January 15, 1994 || Stroncone || A. Vagnozzi || NYS || align=right | 3.3 km || 
|-id=352 bgcolor=#fefefe
| 69352 ||  || — || January 5, 1994 || Kitt Peak || Spacewatch || EUT || align=right | 1.3 km || 
|-id=353 bgcolor=#fefefe
| 69353 ||  || — || January 8, 1994 || Kitt Peak || Spacewatch || NYS || align=right | 1.7 km || 
|-id=354 bgcolor=#fefefe
| 69354 ||  || — || February 10, 1994 || Kitt Peak || Spacewatch || ERI || align=right | 3.8 km || 
|-id=355 bgcolor=#fefefe
| 69355 ||  || — || February 7, 1994 || La Silla || E. W. Elst || — || align=right | 1.6 km || 
|-id=356 bgcolor=#fefefe
| 69356 ||  || — || February 8, 1994 || La Silla || E. W. Elst || — || align=right | 4.5 km || 
|-id=357 bgcolor=#fefefe
| 69357 || 1994 FU || — || March 21, 1994 || Siding Spring || G. J. Garradd || — || align=right | 5.0 km || 
|-id=358 bgcolor=#E9E9E9
| 69358 ||  || — || August 10, 1994 || La Silla || E. W. Elst || — || align=right | 6.8 km || 
|-id=359 bgcolor=#E9E9E9
| 69359 ||  || — || August 10, 1994 || La Silla || E. W. Elst || PAD || align=right | 3.6 km || 
|-id=360 bgcolor=#E9E9E9
| 69360 ||  || — || August 10, 1994 || La Silla || E. W. Elst || — || align=right | 3.2 km || 
|-id=361 bgcolor=#E9E9E9
| 69361 ||  || — || August 10, 1994 || La Silla || E. W. Elst || HEN || align=right | 2.0 km || 
|-id=362 bgcolor=#E9E9E9
| 69362 ||  || — || August 10, 1994 || La Silla || E. W. Elst || — || align=right | 3.8 km || 
|-id=363 bgcolor=#E9E9E9
| 69363 ||  || — || August 10, 1994 || La Silla || E. W. Elst || — || align=right | 3.6 km || 
|-id=364 bgcolor=#E9E9E9
| 69364 ||  || — || August 12, 1994 || La Silla || E. W. Elst || — || align=right | 3.0 km || 
|-id=365 bgcolor=#E9E9E9
| 69365 || 1994 QF || — || August 26, 1994 || Farra d'Isonzo || Farra d'Isonzo || — || align=right | 4.1 km || 
|-id=366 bgcolor=#E9E9E9
| 69366 ||  || — || September 12, 1994 || Kitt Peak || Spacewatch || NEM || align=right | 3.6 km || 
|-id=367 bgcolor=#E9E9E9
| 69367 || 1994 SD || — || September 30, 1994 || Farra d'Isonzo || Farra d'Isonzo || EUN || align=right | 2.4 km || 
|-id=368 bgcolor=#E9E9E9
| 69368 ||  || — || September 28, 1994 || Kitt Peak || Spacewatch || — || align=right | 2.5 km || 
|-id=369 bgcolor=#E9E9E9
| 69369 ||  || — || September 28, 1994 || Kitt Peak || Spacewatch || INO || align=right | 2.5 km || 
|-id=370 bgcolor=#E9E9E9
| 69370 ||  || — || September 29, 1994 || Kitt Peak || Spacewatch || — || align=right | 2.8 km || 
|-id=371 bgcolor=#E9E9E9
| 69371 ||  || — || October 2, 1994 || Kitami || K. Endate, K. Watanabe || PAL || align=right | 7.4 km || 
|-id=372 bgcolor=#E9E9E9
| 69372 ||  || — || October 28, 1994 || Kitt Peak || Spacewatch || DOR || align=right | 6.3 km || 
|-id=373 bgcolor=#E9E9E9
| 69373 ||  || — || October 28, 1994 || Kitt Peak || Spacewatch || AGN || align=right | 2.5 km || 
|-id=374 bgcolor=#E9E9E9
| 69374 ||  || — || October 28, 1994 || Kitt Peak || Spacewatch || — || align=right | 6.3 km || 
|-id=375 bgcolor=#E9E9E9
| 69375 ||  || — || November 4, 1994 || Oizumi || T. Kobayashi || GEF || align=right | 2.7 km || 
|-id=376 bgcolor=#E9E9E9
| 69376 ||  || — || November 27, 1994 || Oizumi || T. Kobayashi || GEF || align=right | 3.5 km || 
|-id=377 bgcolor=#E9E9E9
| 69377 ||  || — || November 28, 1994 || Kushiro || S. Ueda, H. Kaneda || — || align=right | 3.9 km || 
|-id=378 bgcolor=#E9E9E9
| 69378 ||  || — || November 28, 1994 || Kitt Peak || Spacewatch || — || align=right | 5.1 km || 
|-id=379 bgcolor=#E9E9E9
| 69379 ||  || — || November 28, 1994 || Kitt Peak || Spacewatch || — || align=right | 3.8 km || 
|-id=380 bgcolor=#d6d6d6
| 69380 ||  || — || December 31, 1994 || Oizumi || T. Kobayashi || — || align=right | 8.8 km || 
|-id=381 bgcolor=#E9E9E9
| 69381 || 1995 BH || — || January 23, 1995 || Oizumi || T. Kobayashi || — || align=right | 5.3 km || 
|-id=382 bgcolor=#d6d6d6
| 69382 ||  || — || January 29, 1995 || Kitt Peak || Spacewatch || — || align=right | 6.5 km || 
|-id=383 bgcolor=#fefefe
| 69383 ||  || — || January 31, 1995 || Kitt Peak || Spacewatch || — || align=right | 1.7 km || 
|-id=384 bgcolor=#d6d6d6
| 69384 ||  || — || February 1, 1995 || Kitt Peak || Spacewatch || — || align=right | 4.6 km || 
|-id=385 bgcolor=#fefefe
| 69385 ||  || — || February 24, 1995 || Kitt Peak || Spacewatch || — || align=right | 1.7 km || 
|-id=386 bgcolor=#fefefe
| 69386 ||  || — || February 24, 1995 || Kitt Peak || Spacewatch || FLO || align=right | 1.2 km || 
|-id=387 bgcolor=#d6d6d6
| 69387 ||  || — || February 24, 1995 || Kitt Peak || Spacewatch || — || align=right | 7.8 km || 
|-id=388 bgcolor=#d6d6d6
| 69388 ||  || — || March 2, 1995 || Kitt Peak || Spacewatch || EOS || align=right | 4.1 km || 
|-id=389 bgcolor=#fefefe
| 69389 ||  || — || March 23, 1995 || Kitt Peak || Spacewatch || NYS || align=right | 1.1 km || 
|-id=390 bgcolor=#fefefe
| 69390 ||  || — || March 23, 1995 || Kitt Peak || Spacewatch || PHO || align=right | 1.8 km || 
|-id=391 bgcolor=#d6d6d6
| 69391 ||  || — || March 23, 1995 || Kitt Peak || Spacewatch || — || align=right | 6.4 km || 
|-id=392 bgcolor=#fefefe
| 69392 ||  || — || March 25, 1995 || Kitt Peak || Spacewatch || — || align=right | 1.7 km || 
|-id=393 bgcolor=#fefefe
| 69393 ||  || — || March 25, 1995 || Kitt Peak || Spacewatch || — || align=right | 2.1 km || 
|-id=394 bgcolor=#d6d6d6
| 69394 ||  || — || March 25, 1995 || Kitt Peak || Spacewatch || — || align=right | 5.2 km || 
|-id=395 bgcolor=#d6d6d6
| 69395 ||  || — || March 27, 1995 || Kitt Peak || Spacewatch || HYG || align=right | 6.3 km || 
|-id=396 bgcolor=#fefefe
| 69396 ||  || — || March 28, 1995 || Kitt Peak || Spacewatch || — || align=right | 1.6 km || 
|-id=397 bgcolor=#fefefe
| 69397 ||  || — || March 28, 1995 || Kitt Peak || Spacewatch || FLO || align=right | 1.5 km || 
|-id=398 bgcolor=#d6d6d6
| 69398 ||  || — || March 29, 1995 || Kitt Peak || Spacewatch || — || align=right | 5.6 km || 
|-id=399 bgcolor=#d6d6d6
| 69399 ||  || — || April 4, 1995 || Kitt Peak || Spacewatch || VER || align=right | 7.3 km || 
|-id=400 bgcolor=#fefefe
| 69400 ||  || — || July 22, 1995 || Kitt Peak || Spacewatch || — || align=right | 2.2 km || 
|}

69401–69500 

|-bgcolor=#fefefe
| 69401 ||  || — || August 26, 1995 || Siding Spring || R. H. McNaught || — || align=right | 4.3 km || 
|-id=402 bgcolor=#E9E9E9
| 69402 ||  || — || September 17, 1995 || Kitt Peak || Spacewatch || MAR || align=right | 1.4 km || 
|-id=403 bgcolor=#fefefe
| 69403 ||  || — || September 18, 1995 || Kitt Peak || Spacewatch || NYS || align=right | 1.5 km || 
|-id=404 bgcolor=#fefefe
| 69404 ||  || — || September 20, 1995 || Kitt Peak || Spacewatch || CHL || align=right | 4.0 km || 
|-id=405 bgcolor=#fefefe
| 69405 ||  || — || September 30, 1995 || Catalina Station || T. B. Spahr || H || align=right | 2.4 km || 
|-id=406 bgcolor=#fefefe
| 69406 Martz-Kohl ||  ||  || September 30, 1995 || Catalina Station || C. W. Hergenrother || Hmoon || align=right | 3.2 km || 
|-id=407 bgcolor=#E9E9E9
| 69407 ||  || — || September 24, 1995 || Kitt Peak || Spacewatch || — || align=right | 2.0 km || 
|-id=408 bgcolor=#E9E9E9
| 69408 ||  || — || October 1, 1995 || Kitt Peak || Spacewatch || — || align=right | 1.3 km || 
|-id=409 bgcolor=#fefefe
| 69409 || 1995 UQ || — || October 19, 1995 || Dossobuono || L. Lai || — || align=right | 1.9 km || 
|-id=410 bgcolor=#fefefe
| 69410 ||  || — || October 23, 1995 || Catalina Station || T. B. Spahr || H || align=right | 1.4 km || 
|-id=411 bgcolor=#E9E9E9
| 69411 ||  || — || October 21, 1995 || Chichibu || N. Satō, T. Urata || — || align=right | 1.9 km || 
|-id=412 bgcolor=#E9E9E9
| 69412 ||  || — || October 21, 1995 || Kitt Peak || Spacewatch || — || align=right | 2.1 km || 
|-id=413 bgcolor=#E9E9E9
| 69413 || 1995 VA || — || November 1, 1995 || Oizumi || T. Kobayashi || MAR || align=right | 2.5 km || 
|-id=414 bgcolor=#E9E9E9
| 69414 ||  || — || November 15, 1995 || Kitt Peak || Spacewatch || — || align=right | 1.9 km || 
|-id=415 bgcolor=#E9E9E9
| 69415 ||  || — || November 16, 1995 || Kitt Peak || Spacewatch || — || align=right | 2.0 km || 
|-id=416 bgcolor=#E9E9E9
| 69416 ||  || — || November 17, 1995 || Kitt Peak || Spacewatch || — || align=right | 4.0 km || 
|-id=417 bgcolor=#d6d6d6
| 69417 ||  || — || November 21, 1995 || Kitt Peak || Spacewatch || 3:2 || align=right | 9.2 km || 
|-id=418 bgcolor=#E9E9E9
| 69418 ||  || — || November 25, 1995 || Kushiro || S. Ueda, H. Kaneda || EUN || align=right | 4.3 km || 
|-id=419 bgcolor=#E9E9E9
| 69419 ||  || — || December 14, 1995 || Kitt Peak || Spacewatch || — || align=right | 3.8 km || 
|-id=420 bgcolor=#E9E9E9
| 69420 ||  || — || December 21, 1995 || Oizumi || T. Kobayashi || slow || align=right | 6.4 km || 
|-id=421 bgcolor=#E9E9E9
| 69421 Keizosaji ||  ||  || December 22, 1995 || Saji || Saji Obs. || — || align=right | 1.7 km || 
|-id=422 bgcolor=#E9E9E9
| 69422 ||  || — || December 16, 1995 || Kitt Peak || Spacewatch || EUN || align=right | 3.6 km || 
|-id=423 bgcolor=#E9E9E9
| 69423 Openuni ||  ||  || January 15, 1996 || Farra d'Isonzo || Farra d'Isonzo || — || align=right | 3.3 km || 
|-id=424 bgcolor=#E9E9E9
| 69424 ||  || — || January 12, 1996 || Kitt Peak || Spacewatch || — || align=right | 5.7 km || 
|-id=425 bgcolor=#E9E9E9
| 69425 || 1996 BC || — || January 16, 1996 || Stroncone || A. Vagnozzi || — || align=right | 3.4 km || 
|-id=426 bgcolor=#E9E9E9
| 69426 ||  || — || January 19, 1996 || Kitt Peak || Spacewatch || HEN || align=right | 2.4 km || 
|-id=427 bgcolor=#E9E9E9
| 69427 ||  || — || January 21, 1996 || Kitt Peak || Spacewatch || — || align=right | 3.8 km || 
|-id=428 bgcolor=#E9E9E9
| 69428 ||  || — || March 9, 1996 || Xinglong || SCAP || — || align=right | 4.5 km || 
|-id=429 bgcolor=#d6d6d6
| 69429 ||  || — || March 11, 1996 || Kitt Peak || Spacewatch || — || align=right | 7.3 km || 
|-id=430 bgcolor=#d6d6d6
| 69430 ||  || — || April 15, 1996 || Prescott || P. G. Comba || — || align=right | 5.6 km || 
|-id=431 bgcolor=#d6d6d6
| 69431 ||  || — || April 12, 1996 || Kitt Peak || Spacewatch || — || align=right | 5.1 km || 
|-id=432 bgcolor=#d6d6d6
| 69432 ||  || — || April 18, 1996 || La Silla || E. W. Elst || — || align=right | 6.6 km || 
|-id=433 bgcolor=#d6d6d6
| 69433 ||  || — || April 18, 1996 || La Silla || E. W. Elst || — || align=right | 4.3 km || 
|-id=434 bgcolor=#d6d6d6
| 69434 de Gerlache ||  ||  || April 18, 1996 || La Silla || E. W. Elst || — || align=right | 11 km || 
|-id=435 bgcolor=#d6d6d6
| 69435 ||  || — || April 18, 1996 || La Silla || E. W. Elst || THM || align=right | 6.0 km || 
|-id=436 bgcolor=#d6d6d6
| 69436 ||  || — || May 12, 1996 || Kitt Peak || Spacewatch || — || align=right | 6.3 km || 
|-id=437 bgcolor=#C2FFFF
| 69437 ||  || — || May 21, 1996 || Xinglong || SCAP || L5 || align=right | 21 km || 
|-id=438 bgcolor=#d6d6d6
| 69438 ||  || — || June 11, 1996 || Kitt Peak || Spacewatch || EOS || align=right | 3.4 km || 
|-id=439 bgcolor=#fefefe
| 69439 || 1996 PX || — || August 9, 1996 || Haleakala || NEAT || FLO || align=right | 2.0 km || 
|-id=440 bgcolor=#fefefe
| 69440 ||  || — || August 14, 1996 || Haleakala || NEAT || PHO || align=right | 2.3 km || 
|-id=441 bgcolor=#fefefe
| 69441 ||  || — || August 8, 1996 || La Silla || E. W. Elst || FLO || align=right | 1.8 km || 
|-id=442 bgcolor=#fefefe
| 69442 ||  || — || September 8, 1996 || Kitt Peak || Spacewatch || FLO || align=right | 1.6 km || 
|-id=443 bgcolor=#fefefe
| 69443 ||  || — || September 13, 1996 || Kitt Peak || Spacewatch || — || align=right | 2.0 km || 
|-id=444 bgcolor=#fefefe
| 69444 ||  || — || September 13, 1996 || Kitt Peak || Spacewatch || V || align=right | 1.5 km || 
|-id=445 bgcolor=#fefefe
| 69445 ||  || — || September 5, 1996 || Kitt Peak || Spacewatch || — || align=right | 2.4 km || 
|-id=446 bgcolor=#fefefe
| 69446 ||  || — || September 21, 1996 || Xinglong || SCAP || V || align=right | 1.7 km || 
|-id=447 bgcolor=#fefefe
| 69447 ||  || — || September 21, 1996 || Xinglong || SCAP || — || align=right | 1.3 km || 
|-id=448 bgcolor=#fefefe
| 69448 || 1996 TQ || — || October 4, 1996 || Farra d'Isonzo || Farra d'Isonzo || NYS || align=right | 1.6 km || 
|-id=449 bgcolor=#fefefe
| 69449 ||  || — || October 3, 1996 || Xinglong || SCAP || — || align=right | 2.2 km || 
|-id=450 bgcolor=#fefefe
| 69450 ||  || — || October 4, 1996 || Kleť || Kleť Obs. || NYS || align=right | 1.1 km || 
|-id=451 bgcolor=#fefefe
| 69451 ||  || — || October 8, 1996 || Prescott || P. G. Comba || — || align=right | 1.7 km || 
|-id=452 bgcolor=#fefefe
| 69452 ||  || — || October 9, 1996 || Haleakala || NEAT || — || align=right | 2.3 km || 
|-id=453 bgcolor=#fefefe
| 69453 ||  || — || October 11, 1996 || Kitami || K. Endate || — || align=right | 2.1 km || 
|-id=454 bgcolor=#fefefe
| 69454 ||  || — || October 7, 1996 || Kitt Peak || Spacewatch || — || align=right | 2.1 km || 
|-id=455 bgcolor=#fefefe
| 69455 ||  || — || October 10, 1996 || Kitt Peak || Spacewatch || — || align=right | 1.9 km || 
|-id=456 bgcolor=#fefefe
| 69456 ||  || — || October 10, 1996 || Kitt Peak || Spacewatch || FLO || align=right | 1.5 km || 
|-id=457 bgcolor=#fefefe
| 69457 ||  || — || October 12, 1996 || Kitt Peak || Spacewatch || — || align=right | 2.2 km || 
|-id=458 bgcolor=#fefefe
| 69458 ||  || — || October 5, 1996 || Xinglong || SCAP || — || align=right | 1.9 km || 
|-id=459 bgcolor=#fefefe
| 69459 ||  || — || October 6, 1996 || La Silla || E. W. Elst || — || align=right | 1.9 km || 
|-id=460 bgcolor=#fefefe
| 69460 Christibarnard ||  ||  || October 17, 1996 || Colleverde || V. S. Casulli || — || align=right | 2.1 km || 
|-id=461 bgcolor=#fefefe
| 69461 ||  || — || October 24, 1996 || Modra || P. Kolény, L. Kornoš || V || align=right | 2.3 km || 
|-id=462 bgcolor=#fefefe
| 69462 ||  || — || October 29, 1996 || Xinglong || SCAP || V || align=right | 1.1 km || 
|-id=463 bgcolor=#fefefe
| 69463 ||  || — || November 1, 1996 || Xinglong || SCAP || NYS || align=right | 1.5 km || 
|-id=464 bgcolor=#fefefe
| 69464 ||  || — || November 13, 1996 || Oizumi || T. Kobayashi || NYS || align=right | 2.1 km || 
|-id=465 bgcolor=#fefefe
| 69465 ||  || — || November 14, 1996 || Oizumi || T. Kobayashi || NYS || align=right | 2.6 km || 
|-id=466 bgcolor=#FA8072
| 69466 ||  || — || November 15, 1996 || Oizumi || T. Kobayashi || — || align=right | 2.9 km || 
|-id=467 bgcolor=#fefefe
| 69467 ||  || — || November 5, 1996 || Kitt Peak || Spacewatch || — || align=right | 4.8 km || 
|-id=468 bgcolor=#fefefe
| 69468 ||  || — || November 5, 1996 || Kitt Peak || Spacewatch || MAS || align=right | 1.6 km || 
|-id=469 bgcolor=#fefefe
| 69469 Krumbenowe || 1996 WR ||  || November 16, 1996 || Kleť || J. Tichá, M. Tichý || — || align=right | 1.4 km || 
|-id=470 bgcolor=#fefefe
| 69470 || 1996 XH || — || December 1, 1996 || Oohira || T. Urata || NYS || align=right | 1.5 km || 
|-id=471 bgcolor=#fefefe
| 69471 ||  || — || December 2, 1996 || Oizumi || T. Kobayashi || NYS || align=right | 2.0 km || 
|-id=472 bgcolor=#fefefe
| 69472 ||  || — || December 2, 1996 || Oizumi || T. Kobayashi || NYS || align=right | 1.5 km || 
|-id=473 bgcolor=#fefefe
| 69473 ||  || — || December 2, 1996 || Oizumi || T. Kobayashi || V || align=right | 2.4 km || 
|-id=474 bgcolor=#fefefe
| 69474 ||  || — || December 3, 1996 || Oizumi || T. Kobayashi || — || align=right | 4.7 km || 
|-id=475 bgcolor=#fefefe
| 69475 ||  || — || December 6, 1996 || Kleť || Kleť Obs. || — || align=right | 2.0 km || 
|-id=476 bgcolor=#fefefe
| 69476 ||  || — || December 1, 1996 || Kitt Peak || Spacewatch || — || align=right | 1.6 km || 
|-id=477 bgcolor=#fefefe
| 69477 ||  || — || December 4, 1996 || Kitt Peak || Spacewatch || MAS || align=right | 1.5 km || 
|-id=478 bgcolor=#fefefe
| 69478 ||  || — || December 10, 1996 || Xinglong || SCAP || MAS || align=right | 2.0 km || 
|-id=479 bgcolor=#fefefe
| 69479 ||  || — || December 4, 1996 || Kitt Peak || Spacewatch || MAS || align=right | 1.1 km || 
|-id=480 bgcolor=#fefefe
| 69480 ||  || — || December 8, 1996 || Oizumi || T. Kobayashi || MAS || align=right | 1.5 km || 
|-id=481 bgcolor=#fefefe
| 69481 ||  || — || December 11, 1996 || Oizumi || T. Kobayashi || NYS || align=right | 2.5 km || 
|-id=482 bgcolor=#fefefe
| 69482 ||  || — || December 8, 1996 || Chichibu || N. Satō || NYS || align=right | 1.7 km || 
|-id=483 bgcolor=#fefefe
| 69483 ||  || — || December 14, 1996 || Oizumi || T. Kobayashi || — || align=right | 1.7 km || 
|-id=484 bgcolor=#fefefe
| 69484 ||  || — || December 18, 1996 || Xinglong || SCAP || — || align=right | 2.6 km || 
|-id=485 bgcolor=#E9E9E9
| 69485 || 1997 AD || — || January 2, 1997 || Oizumi || T. Kobayashi || — || align=right | 4.3 km || 
|-id=486 bgcolor=#fefefe
| 69486 ||  || — || January 2, 1997 || Chichibu || N. Satō || NYS || align=right | 3.2 km || 
|-id=487 bgcolor=#fefefe
| 69487 ||  || — || January 4, 1997 || Oizumi || T. Kobayashi || — || align=right | 4.2 km || 
|-id=488 bgcolor=#fefefe
| 69488 ||  || — || January 3, 1997 || Oohira || T. Urata || NYS || align=right | 4.4 km || 
|-id=489 bgcolor=#fefefe
| 69489 ||  || — || January 6, 1997 || Oizumi || T. Kobayashi || — || align=right | 1.7 km || 
|-id=490 bgcolor=#fefefe
| 69490 ||  || — || January 3, 1997 || Chichibu || N. Satō || — || align=right | 3.6 km || 
|-id=491 bgcolor=#fefefe
| 69491 ||  || — || January 2, 1997 || Xinglong || SCAP || — || align=right | 2.7 km || 
|-id=492 bgcolor=#fefefe
| 69492 ||  || — || January 9, 1997 || Oizumi || T. Kobayashi || — || align=right | 1.5 km || 
|-id=493 bgcolor=#fefefe
| 69493 ||  || — || January 11, 1997 || Prescott || P. G. Comba || — || align=right | 2.4 km || 
|-id=494 bgcolor=#fefefe
| 69494 ||  || — || January 13, 1997 || Oizumi || T. Kobayashi || — || align=right | 4.8 km || 
|-id=495 bgcolor=#fefefe
| 69495 ||  || — || January 15, 1997 || Oizumi || T. Kobayashi || — || align=right | 2.2 km || 
|-id=496 bgcolor=#fefefe
| 69496 Zaoryuzan ||  ||  || January 13, 1997 || Nanyo || T. Okuni || — || align=right | 1.9 km || 
|-id=497 bgcolor=#E9E9E9
| 69497 ||  || — || January 30, 1997 || Oizumi || T. Kobayashi || — || align=right | 2.0 km || 
|-id=498 bgcolor=#E9E9E9
| 69498 ||  || — || February 1, 1997 || Oizumi || T. Kobayashi || — || align=right | 6.2 km || 
|-id=499 bgcolor=#fefefe
| 69499 ||  || — || February 3, 1997 || Haleakala || NEAT || — || align=right | 2.7 km || 
|-id=500 bgcolor=#fefefe
| 69500 Ginobartali ||  ||  || February 6, 1997 || Colleverde || V. S. Casulli || NYS || align=right | 1.4 km || 
|}

69501–69600 

|-bgcolor=#E9E9E9
| 69501 ||  || — || February 3, 1997 || Kitt Peak || Spacewatch || — || align=right | 2.6 km || 
|-id=502 bgcolor=#fefefe
| 69502 ||  || — || February 3, 1997 || Kitt Peak || Spacewatch || NYS || align=right | 1.4 km || 
|-id=503 bgcolor=#E9E9E9
| 69503 ||  || — || February 6, 1997 || Kitt Peak || Spacewatch || — || align=right | 1.9 km || 
|-id=504 bgcolor=#E9E9E9
| 69504 ||  || — || February 12, 1997 || Oizumi || T. Kobayashi || ADE || align=right | 6.0 km || 
|-id=505 bgcolor=#fefefe
| 69505 ||  || — || February 11, 1997 || Oohira || T. Urata || — || align=right | 4.6 km || 
|-id=506 bgcolor=#E9E9E9
| 69506 ||  || — || February 14, 1997 || Oizumi || T. Kobayashi || — || align=right | 3.6 km || 
|-id=507 bgcolor=#fefefe
| 69507 ||  || — || February 4, 1997 || Xinglong || SCAP || — || align=right | 1.7 km || 
|-id=508 bgcolor=#E9E9E9
| 69508 ||  || — || March 4, 1997 || Oizumi || T. Kobayashi || — || align=right | 3.2 km || 
|-id=509 bgcolor=#E9E9E9
| 69509 ||  || — || March 2, 1997 || Kitt Peak || Spacewatch || — || align=right | 2.1 km || 
|-id=510 bgcolor=#E9E9E9
| 69510 ||  || — || March 4, 1997 || Kitt Peak || Spacewatch || HEN || align=right | 2.2 km || 
|-id=511 bgcolor=#fefefe
| 69511 ||  || — || March 4, 1997 || Socorro || LINEAR || NYS || align=right | 1.9 km || 
|-id=512 bgcolor=#fefefe
| 69512 ||  || — || March 5, 1997 || Socorro || LINEAR || — || align=right | 2.2 km || 
|-id=513 bgcolor=#E9E9E9
| 69513 ||  || — || March 5, 1997 || Socorro || LINEAR || — || align=right | 3.2 km || 
|-id=514 bgcolor=#E9E9E9
| 69514 ||  || — || March 12, 1997 || La Silla || E. W. Elst || — || align=right | 5.6 km || 
|-id=515 bgcolor=#E9E9E9
| 69515 ||  || — || March 12, 1997 || La Silla || E. W. Elst || — || align=right | 3.1 km || 
|-id=516 bgcolor=#E9E9E9
| 69516 || 1997 FJ || — || March 21, 1997 || Xinglong || SCAP || — || align=right | 4.1 km || 
|-id=517 bgcolor=#E9E9E9
| 69517 ||  || — || March 31, 1997 || Socorro || LINEAR || EUN || align=right | 2.9 km || 
|-id=518 bgcolor=#E9E9E9
| 69518 ||  || — || March 28, 1997 || Xinglong || SCAP || BAR || align=right | 3.9 km || 
|-id=519 bgcolor=#E9E9E9
| 69519 ||  || — || April 2, 1997 || Kitt Peak || Spacewatch || — || align=right | 2.2 km || 
|-id=520 bgcolor=#E9E9E9
| 69520 ||  || — || April 7, 1997 || Kitt Peak || Spacewatch || — || align=right | 2.6 km || 
|-id=521 bgcolor=#E9E9E9
| 69521 ||  || — || April 7, 1997 || Kitt Peak || Spacewatch || — || align=right | 3.5 km || 
|-id=522 bgcolor=#E9E9E9
| 69522 ||  || — || April 2, 1997 || Socorro || LINEAR || — || align=right | 3.9 km || 
|-id=523 bgcolor=#E9E9E9
| 69523 ||  || — || April 2, 1997 || Socorro || LINEAR || — || align=right | 3.9 km || 
|-id=524 bgcolor=#E9E9E9
| 69524 ||  || — || April 2, 1997 || Socorro || LINEAR || GER || align=right | 7.7 km || 
|-id=525 bgcolor=#E9E9E9
| 69525 ||  || — || April 3, 1997 || Socorro || LINEAR || — || align=right | 2.7 km || 
|-id=526 bgcolor=#E9E9E9
| 69526 ||  || — || April 3, 1997 || Socorro || LINEAR || — || align=right | 2.7 km || 
|-id=527 bgcolor=#E9E9E9
| 69527 ||  || — || April 3, 1997 || Socorro || LINEAR || — || align=right | 1.5 km || 
|-id=528 bgcolor=#fefefe
| 69528 ||  || — || April 3, 1997 || Socorro || LINEAR || NYS || align=right | 1.4 km || 
|-id=529 bgcolor=#E9E9E9
| 69529 ||  || — || April 3, 1997 || Socorro || LINEAR || — || align=right | 1.7 km || 
|-id=530 bgcolor=#E9E9E9
| 69530 ||  || — || April 3, 1997 || Socorro || LINEAR || — || align=right | 1.7 km || 
|-id=531 bgcolor=#E9E9E9
| 69531 ||  || — || April 3, 1997 || Socorro || LINEAR || — || align=right | 2.2 km || 
|-id=532 bgcolor=#E9E9E9
| 69532 ||  || — || April 3, 1997 || Socorro || LINEAR || — || align=right | 2.1 km || 
|-id=533 bgcolor=#E9E9E9
| 69533 ||  || — || April 3, 1997 || Socorro || LINEAR || — || align=right | 6.8 km || 
|-id=534 bgcolor=#E9E9E9
| 69534 ||  || — || April 5, 1997 || Socorro || LINEAR || — || align=right | 4.8 km || 
|-id=535 bgcolor=#E9E9E9
| 69535 ||  || — || April 6, 1997 || Socorro || LINEAR || — || align=right | 3.1 km || 
|-id=536 bgcolor=#E9E9E9
| 69536 ||  || — || April 7, 1997 || Socorro || LINEAR || — || align=right | 3.8 km || 
|-id=537 bgcolor=#E9E9E9
| 69537 ||  || — || April 3, 1997 || Socorro || LINEAR || — || align=right | 3.3 km || 
|-id=538 bgcolor=#E9E9E9
| 69538 ||  || — || April 6, 1997 || Socorro || LINEAR || — || align=right | 8.0 km || 
|-id=539 bgcolor=#E9E9E9
| 69539 ||  || — || April 7, 1997 || La Silla || E. W. Elst || — || align=right | 2.8 km || 
|-id=540 bgcolor=#E9E9E9
| 69540 ||  || — || April 29, 1997 || Modra || Modra Obs. || — || align=right | 2.7 km || 
|-id=541 bgcolor=#d6d6d6
| 69541 ||  || — || April 30, 1997 || Socorro || LINEAR || THM || align=right | 5.5 km || 
|-id=542 bgcolor=#E9E9E9
| 69542 ||  || — || April 30, 1997 || Socorro || LINEAR || — || align=right | 3.8 km || 
|-id=543 bgcolor=#E9E9E9
| 69543 ||  || — || May 4, 1997 || Mauna Kea || C. Veillet || — || align=right | 3.5 km || 
|-id=544 bgcolor=#E9E9E9
| 69544 ||  || — || May 9, 1997 || Mauna Kea || C. Veillet || — || align=right | 3.8 km || 
|-id=545 bgcolor=#E9E9E9
| 69545 ||  || — || May 11, 1997 || Prescott || P. G. Comba || — || align=right | 2.7 km || 
|-id=546 bgcolor=#E9E9E9
| 69546 ||  || — || May 3, 1997 || La Silla || E. W. Elst || — || align=right | 3.0 km || 
|-id=547 bgcolor=#E9E9E9
| 69547 ||  || — || May 27, 1997 || Kitt Peak || Spacewatch || — || align=right | 2.4 km || 
|-id=548 bgcolor=#E9E9E9
| 69548 ||  || — || June 5, 1997 || Kitt Peak || Spacewatch || — || align=right | 6.0 km || 
|-id=549 bgcolor=#fefefe
| 69549 ||  || — || June 9, 1997 || Rand || G. R. Viscome || H || align=right | 1.5 km || 
|-id=550 bgcolor=#E9E9E9
| 69550 ||  || — || June 13, 1997 || Kitt Peak || Spacewatch || — || align=right | 6.3 km || 
|-id=551 bgcolor=#d6d6d6
| 69551 ||  || — || June 28, 1997 || Socorro || LINEAR || ANF || align=right | 6.0 km || 
|-id=552 bgcolor=#d6d6d6
| 69552 ||  || — || June 28, 1997 || Socorro || LINEAR || — || align=right | 4.8 km || 
|-id=553 bgcolor=#d6d6d6
| 69553 ||  || — || August 31, 1997 || Kleť || Z. Moravec || — || align=right | 7.7 km || 
|-id=554 bgcolor=#d6d6d6
| 69554 ||  || — || September 25, 1997 || Farra d'Isonzo || Farra d'Isonzo || ALA || align=right | 8.0 km || 
|-id=555 bgcolor=#d6d6d6
| 69555 ||  || — || September 28, 1997 || Kitt Peak || Spacewatch || — || align=right | 6.2 km || 
|-id=556 bgcolor=#d6d6d6
| 69556 ||  || — || September 27, 1997 || Mallorca || Á. López J., R. Pacheco || — || align=right | 9.4 km || 
|-id=557 bgcolor=#d6d6d6
| 69557 ||  || — || September 30, 1997 || Kitt Peak || Spacewatch || VER || align=right | 6.6 km || 
|-id=558 bgcolor=#d6d6d6
| 69558 ||  || — || October 10, 1997 || Xinglong || SCAP || — || align=right | 5.4 km || 
|-id=559 bgcolor=#d6d6d6
| 69559 ||  || — || October 27, 1997 || Prescott || P. G. Comba || — || align=right | 9.9 km || 
|-id=560 bgcolor=#d6d6d6
| 69560 ||  || — || October 31, 1997 || Ondřejov || P. Pravec || — || align=right | 7.9 km || 
|-id=561 bgcolor=#fefefe
| 69561 ||  || — || December 21, 1997 || Oizumi || T. Kobayashi || FLO || align=right | 1.8 km || 
|-id=562 bgcolor=#fefefe
| 69562 ||  || — || December 25, 1997 || Chichibu || N. Satō || V || align=right | 1.9 km || 
|-id=563 bgcolor=#fefefe
| 69563 ||  || — || December 28, 1997 || Oizumi || T. Kobayashi || FLO || align=right | 1.6 km || 
|-id=564 bgcolor=#fefefe
| 69564 ||  || — || December 31, 1997 || Kitt Peak || Spacewatch || — || align=right | 1.5 km || 
|-id=565 bgcolor=#fefefe
| 69565 Giulioscarfi ||  ||  || January 5, 1998 || Monte Viseggi || L. Sannino, P. Pietrapriana || — || align=right | 1.9 km || 
|-id=566 bgcolor=#d6d6d6
| 69566 || 1998 BX || — || January 19, 1998 || Oizumi || T. Kobayashi || SHU3:2 || align=right | 16 km || 
|-id=567 bgcolor=#fefefe
| 69567 ||  || — || January 25, 1998 || Oizumi || T. Kobayashi || — || align=right | 2.2 km || 
|-id=568 bgcolor=#fefefe
| 69568 ||  || — || January 23, 1998 || Socorro || LINEAR || V || align=right | 2.1 km || 
|-id=569 bgcolor=#fefefe
| 69569 ||  || — || January 23, 1998 || Socorro || LINEAR || V || align=right | 1.5 km || 
|-id=570 bgcolor=#fefefe
| 69570 ||  || — || January 28, 1998 || Oizumi || T. Kobayashi || — || align=right | 3.9 km || 
|-id=571 bgcolor=#fefefe
| 69571 ||  || — || January 28, 1998 || Oizumi || T. Kobayashi || — || align=right | 2.7 km || 
|-id=572 bgcolor=#fefefe
| 69572 ||  || — || January 29, 1998 || Oizumi || T. Kobayashi || — || align=right | 3.8 km || 
|-id=573 bgcolor=#fefefe
| 69573 ||  || — || January 28, 1998 || Sormano || P. Sicoli, A. Testa || FLO || align=right | 1.6 km || 
|-id=574 bgcolor=#fefefe
| 69574 ||  || — || January 28, 1998 || Kitt Peak || Spacewatch || V || align=right | 1.4 km || 
|-id=575 bgcolor=#fefefe
| 69575 ||  || — || January 22, 1998 || Kitt Peak || Spacewatch || MAS || align=right | 1.3 km || 
|-id=576 bgcolor=#fefefe
| 69576 ||  || — || January 28, 1998 || Caussols || ODAS || — || align=right | 1.8 km || 
|-id=577 bgcolor=#fefefe
| 69577 ||  || — || February 6, 1998 || La Silla || E. W. Elst || NYS || align=right | 4.7 km || 
|-id=578 bgcolor=#fefefe
| 69578 || 1998 DC || — || February 16, 1998 || Xinglong || SCAP || — || align=right | 1.9 km || 
|-id=579 bgcolor=#fefefe
| 69579 ||  || — || February 20, 1998 || Kleť || Kleť Obs. || — || align=right | 1.3 km || 
|-id=580 bgcolor=#fefefe
| 69580 ||  || — || February 22, 1998 || Haleakala || NEAT || — || align=right | 6.0 km || 
|-id=581 bgcolor=#fefefe
| 69581 ||  || — || February 23, 1998 || Kitt Peak || Spacewatch || — || align=right | 2.0 km || 
|-id=582 bgcolor=#fefefe
| 69582 ||  || — || February 23, 1998 || Haleakala || NEAT || V || align=right | 2.0 km || 
|-id=583 bgcolor=#fefefe
| 69583 ||  || — || February 23, 1998 || Haleakala || NEAT || — || align=right | 2.1 km || 
|-id=584 bgcolor=#fefefe
| 69584 ||  || — || February 17, 1998 || Xinglong || SCAP || — || align=right | 2.3 km || 
|-id=585 bgcolor=#fefefe
| 69585 Albertoraugei ||  ||  || February 27, 1998 || Cima Ekar || A. Boattini, M. Tombelli || — || align=right | 3.5 km || 
|-id=586 bgcolor=#fefefe
| 69586 ||  || — || February 25, 1998 || La Silla || E. W. Elst || FLO || align=right | 2.6 km || 
|-id=587 bgcolor=#fefefe
| 69587 ||  || — || March 2, 1998 || Caussols || ODAS || — || align=right | 2.2 km || 
|-id=588 bgcolor=#fefefe
| 69588 ||  || — || March 2, 1998 || Kitt Peak || Spacewatch || — || align=right | 1.6 km || 
|-id=589 bgcolor=#fefefe
| 69589 ||  || — || March 1, 1998 || Kitt Peak || Spacewatch || — || align=right | 1.8 km || 
|-id=590 bgcolor=#fefefe
| 69590 ||  || — || March 3, 1998 || Nachi-Katsuura || Y. Shimizu, T. Urata || FLO || align=right | 3.0 km || 
|-id=591 bgcolor=#fefefe
| 69591 ||  || — || March 1, 1998 || La Silla || E. W. Elst || NYS || align=right | 3.0 km || 
|-id=592 bgcolor=#fefefe
| 69592 ||  || — || March 1, 1998 || La Silla || E. W. Elst || — || align=right | 4.7 km || 
|-id=593 bgcolor=#fefefe
| 69593 ||  || — || March 11, 1998 || Xinglong || SCAP || — || align=right | 2.4 km || 
|-id=594 bgcolor=#fefefe
| 69594 Ulferika ||  ||  || March 24, 1998 || Drebach || G. Lehmann || NYS || align=right | 1.7 km || 
|-id=595 bgcolor=#fefefe
| 69595 ||  || — || March 22, 1998 || Oizumi || T. Kobayashi || V || align=right | 2.0 km || 
|-id=596 bgcolor=#fefefe
| 69596 ||  || — || March 26, 1998 || Caussols || ODAS || V || align=right | 2.2 km || 
|-id=597 bgcolor=#fefefe
| 69597 ||  || — || March 28, 1998 || Caussols || ODAS || — || align=right | 2.2 km || 
|-id=598 bgcolor=#fefefe
| 69598 ||  || — || March 20, 1998 || Socorro || LINEAR || — || align=right | 1.9 km || 
|-id=599 bgcolor=#fefefe
| 69599 ||  || — || March 20, 1998 || Socorro || LINEAR || — || align=right | 2.2 km || 
|-id=600 bgcolor=#fefefe
| 69600 ||  || — || March 20, 1998 || Socorro || LINEAR || V || align=right | 2.0 km || 
|}

69601–69700 

|-bgcolor=#fefefe
| 69601 ||  || — || March 20, 1998 || Socorro || LINEAR || — || align=right | 1.8 km || 
|-id=602 bgcolor=#fefefe
| 69602 ||  || — || March 20, 1998 || Socorro || LINEAR || FLO || align=right | 1.6 km || 
|-id=603 bgcolor=#fefefe
| 69603 ||  || — || March 20, 1998 || Socorro || LINEAR || — || align=right | 2.1 km || 
|-id=604 bgcolor=#fefefe
| 69604 ||  || — || March 20, 1998 || Socorro || LINEAR || FLO || align=right | 1.6 km || 
|-id=605 bgcolor=#fefefe
| 69605 ||  || — || March 20, 1998 || Socorro || LINEAR || EUT || align=right | 1.6 km || 
|-id=606 bgcolor=#fefefe
| 69606 ||  || — || March 20, 1998 || Socorro || LINEAR || — || align=right | 2.1 km || 
|-id=607 bgcolor=#fefefe
| 69607 ||  || — || March 20, 1998 || Socorro || LINEAR || NYS || align=right | 1.7 km || 
|-id=608 bgcolor=#fefefe
| 69608 ||  || — || March 20, 1998 || Socorro || LINEAR || — || align=right | 2.5 km || 
|-id=609 bgcolor=#fefefe
| 69609 ||  || — || March 20, 1998 || Socorro || LINEAR || — || align=right | 2.1 km || 
|-id=610 bgcolor=#fefefe
| 69610 ||  || — || March 20, 1998 || Socorro || LINEAR || NYS || align=right | 1.7 km || 
|-id=611 bgcolor=#fefefe
| 69611 ||  || — || March 20, 1998 || Socorro || LINEAR || — || align=right | 1.7 km || 
|-id=612 bgcolor=#fefefe
| 69612 ||  || — || March 20, 1998 || Socorro || LINEAR || FLO || align=right | 1.5 km || 
|-id=613 bgcolor=#fefefe
| 69613 ||  || — || March 20, 1998 || Socorro || LINEAR || V || align=right | 2.7 km || 
|-id=614 bgcolor=#fefefe
| 69614 ||  || — || March 20, 1998 || Socorro || LINEAR || — || align=right | 2.3 km || 
|-id=615 bgcolor=#fefefe
| 69615 ||  || — || March 20, 1998 || Socorro || LINEAR || NYS || align=right | 1.4 km || 
|-id=616 bgcolor=#fefefe
| 69616 ||  || — || March 20, 1998 || Socorro || LINEAR || V || align=right | 1.7 km || 
|-id=617 bgcolor=#fefefe
| 69617 ||  || — || March 20, 1998 || Socorro || LINEAR || FLO || align=right | 2.0 km || 
|-id=618 bgcolor=#fefefe
| 69618 ||  || — || March 20, 1998 || Socorro || LINEAR || — || align=right | 2.2 km || 
|-id=619 bgcolor=#fefefe
| 69619 ||  || — || March 20, 1998 || Socorro || LINEAR || V || align=right | 1.7 km || 
|-id=620 bgcolor=#fefefe
| 69620 ||  || — || March 20, 1998 || Socorro || LINEAR || — || align=right | 2.2 km || 
|-id=621 bgcolor=#fefefe
| 69621 ||  || — || March 20, 1998 || Socorro || LINEAR || — || align=right | 2.2 km || 
|-id=622 bgcolor=#fefefe
| 69622 ||  || — || March 20, 1998 || Socorro || LINEAR || — || align=right | 2.2 km || 
|-id=623 bgcolor=#fefefe
| 69623 ||  || — || March 20, 1998 || Socorro || LINEAR || FLO || align=right | 1.9 km || 
|-id=624 bgcolor=#fefefe
| 69624 ||  || — || March 20, 1998 || Socorro || LINEAR || FLO || align=right | 1.8 km || 
|-id=625 bgcolor=#fefefe
| 69625 ||  || — || March 20, 1998 || Socorro || LINEAR || V || align=right | 2.9 km || 
|-id=626 bgcolor=#fefefe
| 69626 ||  || — || March 20, 1998 || Socorro || LINEAR || NYS || align=right | 4.9 km || 
|-id=627 bgcolor=#fefefe
| 69627 ||  || — || March 20, 1998 || Socorro || LINEAR || — || align=right | 3.5 km || 
|-id=628 bgcolor=#fefefe
| 69628 ||  || — || March 20, 1998 || Socorro || LINEAR || V || align=right | 2.3 km || 
|-id=629 bgcolor=#fefefe
| 69629 ||  || — || March 20, 1998 || Socorro || LINEAR || V || align=right | 1.8 km || 
|-id=630 bgcolor=#fefefe
| 69630 ||  || — || March 20, 1998 || Socorro || LINEAR || FLO || align=right | 1.6 km || 
|-id=631 bgcolor=#E9E9E9
| 69631 ||  || — || March 20, 1998 || Socorro || LINEAR || EUN || align=right | 2.0 km || 
|-id=632 bgcolor=#fefefe
| 69632 ||  || — || March 20, 1998 || Socorro || LINEAR || — || align=right | 1.8 km || 
|-id=633 bgcolor=#E9E9E9
| 69633 ||  || — || March 20, 1998 || Socorro || LINEAR || — || align=right | 1.6 km || 
|-id=634 bgcolor=#fefefe
| 69634 ||  || — || March 20, 1998 || Socorro || LINEAR || NYS || align=right | 1.6 km || 
|-id=635 bgcolor=#fefefe
| 69635 ||  || — || March 20, 1998 || Socorro || LINEAR || — || align=right | 2.3 km || 
|-id=636 bgcolor=#fefefe
| 69636 ||  || — || March 20, 1998 || Socorro || LINEAR || NYS || align=right | 1.7 km || 
|-id=637 bgcolor=#fefefe
| 69637 ||  || — || March 20, 1998 || Socorro || LINEAR || — || align=right | 2.7 km || 
|-id=638 bgcolor=#fefefe
| 69638 ||  || — || March 20, 1998 || Socorro || LINEAR || — || align=right | 1.6 km || 
|-id=639 bgcolor=#fefefe
| 69639 ||  || — || March 24, 1998 || Socorro || LINEAR || V || align=right | 2.5 km || 
|-id=640 bgcolor=#fefefe
| 69640 ||  || — || March 24, 1998 || Socorro || LINEAR || — || align=right | 2.9 km || 
|-id=641 bgcolor=#fefefe
| 69641 ||  || — || March 24, 1998 || Socorro || LINEAR || — || align=right | 2.5 km || 
|-id=642 bgcolor=#fefefe
| 69642 ||  || — || March 24, 1998 || Socorro || LINEAR || — || align=right | 2.2 km || 
|-id=643 bgcolor=#fefefe
| 69643 ||  || — || March 24, 1998 || Socorro || LINEAR || FLO || align=right | 2.0 km || 
|-id=644 bgcolor=#fefefe
| 69644 ||  || — || March 24, 1998 || Socorro || LINEAR || — || align=right | 2.1 km || 
|-id=645 bgcolor=#fefefe
| 69645 ||  || — || March 24, 1998 || Socorro || LINEAR || — || align=right | 2.0 km || 
|-id=646 bgcolor=#fefefe
| 69646 ||  || — || March 24, 1998 || Socorro || LINEAR || FLO || align=right | 1.9 km || 
|-id=647 bgcolor=#fefefe
| 69647 ||  || — || March 24, 1998 || Socorro || LINEAR || — || align=right | 2.3 km || 
|-id=648 bgcolor=#fefefe
| 69648 ||  || — || March 24, 1998 || Socorro || LINEAR || — || align=right | 1.8 km || 
|-id=649 bgcolor=#fefefe
| 69649 ||  || — || March 31, 1998 || Socorro || LINEAR || FLO || align=right | 1.7 km || 
|-id=650 bgcolor=#fefefe
| 69650 ||  || — || March 31, 1998 || Socorro || LINEAR || V || align=right | 1.5 km || 
|-id=651 bgcolor=#fefefe
| 69651 ||  || — || March 31, 1998 || Socorro || LINEAR || — || align=right | 2.4 km || 
|-id=652 bgcolor=#fefefe
| 69652 ||  || — || March 31, 1998 || Socorro || LINEAR || — || align=right | 2.0 km || 
|-id=653 bgcolor=#fefefe
| 69653 ||  || — || March 31, 1998 || Socorro || LINEAR || FLOslow || align=right | 2.8 km || 
|-id=654 bgcolor=#fefefe
| 69654 ||  || — || March 31, 1998 || Socorro || LINEAR || — || align=right | 2.2 km || 
|-id=655 bgcolor=#fefefe
| 69655 ||  || — || March 31, 1998 || Socorro || LINEAR || V || align=right | 1.5 km || 
|-id=656 bgcolor=#fefefe
| 69656 ||  || — || March 31, 1998 || Socorro || LINEAR || FLO || align=right | 1.6 km || 
|-id=657 bgcolor=#fefefe
| 69657 ||  || — || March 31, 1998 || Socorro || LINEAR || — || align=right | 2.7 km || 
|-id=658 bgcolor=#fefefe
| 69658 ||  || — || March 31, 1998 || Socorro || LINEAR || — || align=right | 2.6 km || 
|-id=659 bgcolor=#fefefe
| 69659 ||  || — || March 31, 1998 || Socorro || LINEAR || — || align=right | 2.2 km || 
|-id=660 bgcolor=#E9E9E9
| 69660 ||  || — || March 31, 1998 || Socorro || LINEAR || — || align=right | 4.2 km || 
|-id=661 bgcolor=#fefefe
| 69661 ||  || — || March 31, 1998 || Socorro || LINEAR || — || align=right | 1.9 km || 
|-id=662 bgcolor=#fefefe
| 69662 ||  || — || March 31, 1998 || Socorro || LINEAR || — || align=right | 2.3 km || 
|-id=663 bgcolor=#fefefe
| 69663 ||  || — || March 31, 1998 || Socorro || LINEAR || KLI || align=right | 2.9 km || 
|-id=664 bgcolor=#fefefe
| 69664 ||  || — || March 20, 1998 || Socorro || LINEAR || — || align=right | 2.1 km || 
|-id=665 bgcolor=#E9E9E9
| 69665 ||  || — || March 20, 1998 || Socorro || LINEAR || — || align=right | 4.5 km || 
|-id=666 bgcolor=#E9E9E9
| 69666 ||  || — || March 20, 1998 || Socorro || LINEAR || — || align=right | 2.3 km || 
|-id=667 bgcolor=#fefefe
| 69667 ||  || — || March 22, 1998 || Socorro || LINEAR || MAS || align=right | 1.4 km || 
|-id=668 bgcolor=#fefefe
| 69668 ||  || — || March 20, 1998 || Socorro || LINEAR || — || align=right | 1.6 km || 
|-id=669 bgcolor=#fefefe
| 69669 ||  || — || March 28, 1998 || Socorro || LINEAR || NYS || align=right | 1.2 km || 
|-id=670 bgcolor=#fefefe
| 69670 ||  || — || March 29, 1998 || Socorro || LINEAR || NYS || align=right | 1.2 km || 
|-id=671 bgcolor=#E9E9E9
| 69671 ||  || — || April 2, 1998 || Socorro || LINEAR || — || align=right | 2.8 km || 
|-id=672 bgcolor=#fefefe
| 69672 ||  || — || April 2, 1998 || Socorro || LINEAR || PHO || align=right | 2.8 km || 
|-id=673 bgcolor=#fefefe
| 69673 ||  || — || April 2, 1998 || La Silla || E. W. Elst || FLO || align=right | 1.9 km || 
|-id=674 bgcolor=#E9E9E9
| 69674 ||  || — || April 19, 1998 || Kitt Peak || Spacewatch || — || align=right | 3.1 km || 
|-id=675 bgcolor=#fefefe
| 69675 ||  || — || April 23, 1998 || Socorro || LINEAR || PHO || align=right | 2.5 km || 
|-id=676 bgcolor=#fefefe
| 69676 ||  || — || April 18, 1998 || Socorro || LINEAR || V || align=right | 1.5 km || 
|-id=677 bgcolor=#E9E9E9
| 69677 ||  || — || April 24, 1998 || Haleakala || NEAT || — || align=right | 2.1 km || 
|-id=678 bgcolor=#fefefe
| 69678 ||  || — || April 18, 1998 || Kitt Peak || Spacewatch || — || align=right | 1.9 km || 
|-id=679 bgcolor=#fefefe
| 69679 ||  || — || April 22, 1998 || Kitt Peak || Spacewatch || SUL || align=right | 4.1 km || 
|-id=680 bgcolor=#E9E9E9
| 69680 ||  || — || April 22, 1998 || Kitt Peak || Spacewatch || — || align=right | 2.3 km || 
|-id=681 bgcolor=#fefefe
| 69681 ||  || — || April 18, 1998 || Socorro || LINEAR || — || align=right | 2.3 km || 
|-id=682 bgcolor=#fefefe
| 69682 ||  || — || April 18, 1998 || Socorro || LINEAR || NYS || align=right | 1.6 km || 
|-id=683 bgcolor=#fefefe
| 69683 ||  || — || April 20, 1998 || Socorro || LINEAR || NYS || align=right | 1.4 km || 
|-id=684 bgcolor=#E9E9E9
| 69684 ||  || — || April 20, 1998 || Socorro || LINEAR || — || align=right | 2.0 km || 
|-id=685 bgcolor=#E9E9E9
| 69685 ||  || — || April 20, 1998 || Socorro || LINEAR || — || align=right | 2.2 km || 
|-id=686 bgcolor=#fefefe
| 69686 ||  || — || April 28, 1998 || Prescott || P. G. Comba || NYS || align=right | 1.5 km || 
|-id=687 bgcolor=#E9E9E9
| 69687 ||  || — || April 24, 1998 || Mauna Kea || C. Veillet || — || align=right | 2.2 km || 
|-id=688 bgcolor=#fefefe
| 69688 ||  || — || April 18, 1998 || Kitt Peak || Spacewatch || — || align=right | 1.8 km || 
|-id=689 bgcolor=#fefefe
| 69689 ||  || — || April 27, 1998 || Kitt Peak || Spacewatch || V || align=right | 1.3 km || 
|-id=690 bgcolor=#fefefe
| 69690 ||  || — || April 20, 1998 || Socorro || LINEAR || FLO || align=right | 2.2 km || 
|-id=691 bgcolor=#fefefe
| 69691 ||  || — || April 20, 1998 || Socorro || LINEAR || — || align=right | 1.9 km || 
|-id=692 bgcolor=#fefefe
| 69692 ||  || — || April 20, 1998 || Socorro || LINEAR || NYS || align=right | 1.4 km || 
|-id=693 bgcolor=#E9E9E9
| 69693 ||  || — || April 20, 1998 || Socorro || LINEAR || — || align=right | 2.3 km || 
|-id=694 bgcolor=#E9E9E9
| 69694 ||  || — || April 20, 1998 || Socorro || LINEAR || — || align=right | 2.2 km || 
|-id=695 bgcolor=#fefefe
| 69695 ||  || — || April 20, 1998 || Socorro || LINEAR || — || align=right | 2.2 km || 
|-id=696 bgcolor=#fefefe
| 69696 ||  || — || April 20, 1998 || Socorro || LINEAR || V || align=right | 1.8 km || 
|-id=697 bgcolor=#fefefe
| 69697 ||  || — || April 20, 1998 || Socorro || LINEAR || — || align=right | 2.0 km || 
|-id=698 bgcolor=#E9E9E9
| 69698 ||  || — || April 20, 1998 || Socorro || LINEAR || — || align=right | 2.2 km || 
|-id=699 bgcolor=#fefefe
| 69699 ||  || — || April 20, 1998 || Socorro || LINEAR || V || align=right | 1.6 km || 
|-id=700 bgcolor=#fefefe
| 69700 ||  || — || April 20, 1998 || Socorro || LINEAR || NYS || align=right | 1.6 km || 
|}

69701–69800 

|-bgcolor=#FA8072
| 69701 ||  || — || April 30, 1998 || Haleakala || NEAT || — || align=right | 1.8 km || 
|-id=702 bgcolor=#fefefe
| 69702 ||  || — || April 21, 1998 || Socorro || LINEAR || — || align=right | 5.7 km || 
|-id=703 bgcolor=#E9E9E9
| 69703 ||  || — || April 21, 1998 || Socorro || LINEAR || — || align=right | 6.1 km || 
|-id=704 bgcolor=#fefefe
| 69704 ||  || — || April 21, 1998 || Socorro || LINEAR || V || align=right | 1.9 km || 
|-id=705 bgcolor=#fefefe
| 69705 ||  || — || April 21, 1998 || Socorro || LINEAR || — || align=right | 2.3 km || 
|-id=706 bgcolor=#fefefe
| 69706 ||  || — || April 21, 1998 || Socorro || LINEAR || ERI || align=right | 4.4 km || 
|-id=707 bgcolor=#E9E9E9
| 69707 ||  || — || April 21, 1998 || Socorro || LINEAR || — || align=right | 2.0 km || 
|-id=708 bgcolor=#fefefe
| 69708 ||  || — || April 21, 1998 || Socorro || LINEAR || NYS || align=right | 5.0 km || 
|-id=709 bgcolor=#fefefe
| 69709 ||  || — || April 21, 1998 || Socorro || LINEAR || V || align=right | 1.9 km || 
|-id=710 bgcolor=#fefefe
| 69710 ||  || — || April 21, 1998 || Socorro || LINEAR || FLO || align=right | 1.6 km || 
|-id=711 bgcolor=#E9E9E9
| 69711 ||  || — || April 21, 1998 || Socorro || LINEAR || — || align=right | 2.4 km || 
|-id=712 bgcolor=#fefefe
| 69712 ||  || — || April 21, 1998 || Socorro || LINEAR || V || align=right | 1.9 km || 
|-id=713 bgcolor=#fefefe
| 69713 ||  || — || April 21, 1998 || Socorro || LINEAR || FLO || align=right | 2.1 km || 
|-id=714 bgcolor=#fefefe
| 69714 ||  || — || April 21, 1998 || Socorro || LINEAR || — || align=right | 3.1 km || 
|-id=715 bgcolor=#E9E9E9
| 69715 ||  || — || April 23, 1998 || Socorro || LINEAR || — || align=right | 3.3 km || 
|-id=716 bgcolor=#fefefe
| 69716 ||  || — || April 23, 1998 || Socorro || LINEAR || — || align=right | 2.5 km || 
|-id=717 bgcolor=#E9E9E9
| 69717 ||  || — || April 23, 1998 || Socorro || LINEAR || — || align=right | 2.6 km || 
|-id=718 bgcolor=#E9E9E9
| 69718 ||  || — || April 23, 1998 || Socorro || LINEAR || MIT || align=right | 4.6 km || 
|-id=719 bgcolor=#fefefe
| 69719 ||  || — || April 23, 1998 || Socorro || LINEAR || — || align=right | 2.0 km || 
|-id=720 bgcolor=#fefefe
| 69720 ||  || — || April 23, 1998 || Socorro || LINEAR || — || align=right | 2.3 km || 
|-id=721 bgcolor=#E9E9E9
| 69721 ||  || — || April 23, 1998 || Socorro || LINEAR || — || align=right | 2.5 km || 
|-id=722 bgcolor=#fefefe
| 69722 ||  || — || April 18, 1998 || Socorro || LINEAR || V || align=right | 1.6 km || 
|-id=723 bgcolor=#fefefe
| 69723 ||  || — || April 19, 1998 || Socorro || LINEAR || — || align=right | 1.9 km || 
|-id=724 bgcolor=#fefefe
| 69724 ||  || — || April 19, 1998 || Socorro || LINEAR || — || align=right | 1.9 km || 
|-id=725 bgcolor=#fefefe
| 69725 ||  || — || April 20, 1998 || Socorro || LINEAR || V || align=right | 1.6 km || 
|-id=726 bgcolor=#fefefe
| 69726 ||  || — || April 21, 1998 || Socorro || LINEAR || — || align=right | 2.4 km || 
|-id=727 bgcolor=#E9E9E9
| 69727 ||  || — || April 21, 1998 || Socorro || LINEAR || — || align=right | 2.5 km || 
|-id=728 bgcolor=#fefefe
| 69728 ||  || — || April 21, 1998 || Socorro || LINEAR || — || align=right | 2.1 km || 
|-id=729 bgcolor=#E9E9E9
| 69729 ||  || — || April 25, 1998 || La Silla || E. W. Elst || ADE || align=right | 6.5 km || 
|-id=730 bgcolor=#E9E9E9
| 69730 ||  || — || April 25, 1998 || La Silla || E. W. Elst || — || align=right | 4.3 km || 
|-id=731 bgcolor=#fefefe
| 69731 ||  || — || April 22, 1998 || Socorro || LINEAR || NYS || align=right | 1.8 km || 
|-id=732 bgcolor=#fefefe
| 69732 || 1998 JE || — || May 1, 1998 || Kitt Peak || Spacewatch || — || align=right | 3.5 km || 
|-id=733 bgcolor=#fefefe
| 69733 ||  || — || May 1, 1998 || Anderson Mesa || LONEOS || — || align=right | 3.0 km || 
|-id=734 bgcolor=#fefefe
| 69734 ||  || — || May 18, 1998 || Anderson Mesa || LONEOS || NYS || align=right | 2.5 km || 
|-id=735 bgcolor=#fefefe
| 69735 ||  || — || May 22, 1998 || Anderson Mesa || LONEOS || V || align=right | 2.4 km || 
|-id=736 bgcolor=#E9E9E9
| 69736 ||  || — || May 23, 1998 || Anderson Mesa || LONEOS || JUN || align=right | 1.8 km || 
|-id=737 bgcolor=#fefefe
| 69737 ||  || — || May 22, 1998 || Socorro || LINEAR || NYS || align=right | 4.0 km || 
|-id=738 bgcolor=#E9E9E9
| 69738 ||  || — || May 22, 1998 || Socorro || LINEAR || — || align=right | 2.1 km || 
|-id=739 bgcolor=#E9E9E9
| 69739 ||  || — || May 22, 1998 || Socorro || LINEAR || EUN || align=right | 2.1 km || 
|-id=740 bgcolor=#E9E9E9
| 69740 ||  || — || May 22, 1998 || Kitt Peak || Spacewatch || EUN || align=right | 3.2 km || 
|-id=741 bgcolor=#fefefe
| 69741 ||  || — || May 23, 1998 || Socorro || LINEAR || PHO || align=right | 3.6 km || 
|-id=742 bgcolor=#fefefe
| 69742 ||  || — || May 22, 1998 || Socorro || LINEAR || V || align=right | 2.1 km || 
|-id=743 bgcolor=#E9E9E9
| 69743 ||  || — || May 23, 1998 || Socorro || LINEAR || — || align=right | 3.7 km || 
|-id=744 bgcolor=#E9E9E9
| 69744 ||  || — || May 22, 1998 || Socorro || LINEAR || — || align=right | 2.9 km || 
|-id=745 bgcolor=#E9E9E9
| 69745 ||  || — || May 22, 1998 || Socorro || LINEAR || — || align=right | 2.2 km || 
|-id=746 bgcolor=#E9E9E9
| 69746 ||  || — || May 28, 1998 || Xinglong || SCAP || — || align=right | 2.7 km || 
|-id=747 bgcolor=#E9E9E9
| 69747 ||  || — || May 28, 1998 || Xinglong || SCAP || — || align=right | 2.7 km || 
|-id=748 bgcolor=#E9E9E9
| 69748 ||  || — || May 23, 1998 || Socorro || LINEAR || — || align=right | 2.1 km || 
|-id=749 bgcolor=#E9E9E9
| 69749 ||  || — || June 21, 1998 || Prescott || P. G. Comba || — || align=right | 7.4 km || 
|-id=750 bgcolor=#E9E9E9
| 69750 ||  || — || June 19, 1998 || Kitt Peak || Spacewatch || — || align=right | 5.9 km || 
|-id=751 bgcolor=#E9E9E9
| 69751 ||  || — || June 22, 1998 || Kitt Peak || Spacewatch || — || align=right | 4.2 km || 
|-id=752 bgcolor=#E9E9E9
| 69752 ||  || — || June 24, 1998 || Socorro || LINEAR || — || align=right | 2.8 km || 
|-id=753 bgcolor=#E9E9E9
| 69753 ||  || — || June 24, 1998 || Socorro || LINEAR || — || align=right | 5.0 km || 
|-id=754 bgcolor=#E9E9E9
| 69754 Mosesmendel ||  ||  || June 26, 1998 || La Silla || E. W. Elst || ADE || align=right | 5.8 km || 
|-id=755 bgcolor=#E9E9E9
| 69755 ||  || — || June 26, 1998 || La Silla || E. W. Elst || — || align=right | 2.7 km || 
|-id=756 bgcolor=#E9E9E9
| 69756 ||  || — || July 24, 1998 || Caussols || ODAS || HOF || align=right | 4.0 km || 
|-id=757 bgcolor=#E9E9E9
| 69757 ||  || — || July 28, 1998 || Xinglong || SCAP || GEF || align=right | 3.6 km || 
|-id=758 bgcolor=#E9E9E9
| 69758 ||  || — || July 26, 1998 || La Silla || E. W. Elst || ADE || align=right | 8.8 km || 
|-id=759 bgcolor=#E9E9E9
| 69759 ||  || — || July 26, 1998 || La Silla || E. W. Elst || HOF || align=right | 8.0 km || 
|-id=760 bgcolor=#E9E9E9
| 69760 || 1998 PR || — || August 15, 1998 || Prescott || P. G. Comba || — || align=right | 6.7 km || 
|-id=761 bgcolor=#E9E9E9
| 69761 ||  || — || August 21, 1998 || Woomera || F. B. Zoltowski || — || align=right | 3.2 km || 
|-id=762 bgcolor=#E9E9E9
| 69762 ||  || — || August 23, 1998 || Prescott || P. G. Comba || — || align=right | 7.6 km || 
|-id=763 bgcolor=#E9E9E9
| 69763 ||  || — || August 17, 1998 || Socorro || LINEAR || — || align=right | 5.9 km || 
|-id=764 bgcolor=#E9E9E9
| 69764 ||  || — || August 17, 1998 || Socorro || LINEAR || ADE || align=right | 5.8 km || 
|-id=765 bgcolor=#E9E9E9
| 69765 ||  || — || August 17, 1998 || Socorro || LINEAR || — || align=right | 6.3 km || 
|-id=766 bgcolor=#E9E9E9
| 69766 ||  || — || August 17, 1998 || Socorro || LINEAR || PAD || align=right | 5.7 km || 
|-id=767 bgcolor=#E9E9E9
| 69767 ||  || — || August 17, 1998 || Socorro || LINEAR || — || align=right | 5.3 km || 
|-id=768 bgcolor=#E9E9E9
| 69768 ||  || — || August 17, 1998 || Socorro || LINEAR || — || align=right | 6.0 km || 
|-id=769 bgcolor=#E9E9E9
| 69769 ||  || — || August 17, 1998 || Socorro || LINEAR || — || align=right | 4.7 km || 
|-id=770 bgcolor=#E9E9E9
| 69770 ||  || — || August 24, 1998 || Reedy Creek || J. Broughton || — || align=right | 5.3 km || 
|-id=771 bgcolor=#d6d6d6
| 69771 ||  || — || August 17, 1998 || Socorro || LINEAR || KOR || align=right | 3.6 km || 
|-id=772 bgcolor=#E9E9E9
| 69772 ||  || — || August 17, 1998 || Socorro || LINEAR || — || align=right | 6.6 km || 
|-id=773 bgcolor=#E9E9E9
| 69773 ||  || — || August 17, 1998 || Socorro || LINEAR || — || align=right | 4.2 km || 
|-id=774 bgcolor=#d6d6d6
| 69774 ||  || — || August 17, 1998 || Socorro || LINEAR || — || align=right | 3.8 km || 
|-id=775 bgcolor=#d6d6d6
| 69775 ||  || — || August 17, 1998 || Socorro || LINEAR || — || align=right | 7.2 km || 
|-id=776 bgcolor=#E9E9E9
| 69776 ||  || — || August 17, 1998 || Socorro || LINEAR || — || align=right | 3.2 km || 
|-id=777 bgcolor=#E9E9E9
| 69777 ||  || — || August 17, 1998 || Socorro || LINEAR || GAL || align=right | 4.4 km || 
|-id=778 bgcolor=#d6d6d6
| 69778 ||  || — || August 20, 1998 || Anderson Mesa || LONEOS || EOS || align=right | 5.6 km || 
|-id=779 bgcolor=#E9E9E9
| 69779 ||  || — || August 19, 1998 || Anderson Mesa || LONEOS || CLO || align=right | 4.7 km || 
|-id=780 bgcolor=#E9E9E9
| 69780 ||  || — || August 27, 1998 || Anderson Mesa || LONEOS || — || align=right | 6.4 km || 
|-id=781 bgcolor=#E9E9E9
| 69781 ||  || — || August 26, 1998 || Kitt Peak || Spacewatch || — || align=right | 4.5 km || 
|-id=782 bgcolor=#d6d6d6
| 69782 ||  || — || August 26, 1998 || Kitt Peak || Spacewatch || KOR || align=right | 3.8 km || 
|-id=783 bgcolor=#E9E9E9
| 69783 ||  || — || August 24, 1998 || Socorro || LINEAR || — || align=right | 3.8 km || 
|-id=784 bgcolor=#E9E9E9
| 69784 ||  || — || August 24, 1998 || Socorro || LINEAR || EUN || align=right | 3.3 km || 
|-id=785 bgcolor=#E9E9E9
| 69785 ||  || — || August 24, 1998 || Socorro || LINEAR || — || align=right | 6.6 km || 
|-id=786 bgcolor=#d6d6d6
| 69786 ||  || — || August 24, 1998 || Socorro || LINEAR || — || align=right | 5.5 km || 
|-id=787 bgcolor=#E9E9E9
| 69787 ||  || — || August 24, 1998 || Socorro || LINEAR || — || align=right | 3.4 km || 
|-id=788 bgcolor=#E9E9E9
| 69788 ||  || — || August 24, 1998 || Socorro || LINEAR || — || align=right | 4.0 km || 
|-id=789 bgcolor=#E9E9E9
| 69789 ||  || — || August 24, 1998 || Socorro || LINEAR || — || align=right | 3.8 km || 
|-id=790 bgcolor=#d6d6d6
| 69790 ||  || — || August 24, 1998 || Socorro || LINEAR || — || align=right | 5.8 km || 
|-id=791 bgcolor=#E9E9E9
| 69791 ||  || — || August 24, 1998 || Socorro || LINEAR || — || align=right | 5.0 km || 
|-id=792 bgcolor=#d6d6d6
| 69792 ||  || — || August 19, 1998 || Socorro || LINEAR || YAK || align=right | 7.9 km || 
|-id=793 bgcolor=#d6d6d6
| 69793 ||  || — || August 19, 1998 || Socorro || LINEAR || — || align=right | 4.1 km || 
|-id=794 bgcolor=#d6d6d6
| 69794 ||  || — || August 26, 1998 || La Silla || E. W. Elst || — || align=right | 6.7 km || 
|-id=795 bgcolor=#d6d6d6
| 69795 ||  || — || September 13, 1998 || Kitt Peak || Spacewatch || KOR || align=right | 3.2 km || 
|-id=796 bgcolor=#d6d6d6
| 69796 ||  || — || September 15, 1998 || Caussols || ODAS || — || align=right | 4.4 km || 
|-id=797 bgcolor=#E9E9E9
| 69797 ||  || — || September 14, 1998 || Anderson Mesa || LONEOS || WIT || align=right | 3.1 km || 
|-id=798 bgcolor=#d6d6d6
| 69798 ||  || — || September 13, 1998 || Kitt Peak || Spacewatch || — || align=right | 4.4 km || 
|-id=799 bgcolor=#E9E9E9
| 69799 ||  || — || September 14, 1998 || Kitt Peak || Spacewatch || — || align=right | 4.1 km || 
|-id=800 bgcolor=#d6d6d6
| 69800 ||  || — || September 14, 1998 || Kitt Peak || Spacewatch || KOR || align=right | 4.3 km || 
|}

69801–69900 

|-bgcolor=#d6d6d6
| 69801 ||  || — || September 14, 1998 || Kitt Peak || Spacewatch || — || align=right | 6.6 km || 
|-id=802 bgcolor=#d6d6d6
| 69802 ||  || — || September 14, 1998 || Xinglong || SCAP || KAR || align=right | 3.0 km || 
|-id=803 bgcolor=#E9E9E9
| 69803 ||  || — || September 15, 1998 || Reedy Creek || J. Broughton || — || align=right | 4.1 km || 
|-id=804 bgcolor=#E9E9E9
| 69804 ||  || — || September 14, 1998 || Socorro || LINEAR || GEF || align=right | 3.0 km || 
|-id=805 bgcolor=#E9E9E9
| 69805 ||  || — || September 14, 1998 || Socorro || LINEAR || — || align=right | 5.4 km || 
|-id=806 bgcolor=#E9E9E9
| 69806 ||  || — || September 14, 1998 || Socorro || LINEAR || — || align=right | 5.2 km || 
|-id=807 bgcolor=#E9E9E9
| 69807 ||  || — || September 14, 1998 || Socorro || LINEAR || AGN || align=right | 3.0 km || 
|-id=808 bgcolor=#E9E9E9
| 69808 ||  || — || September 14, 1998 || Socorro || LINEAR || — || align=right | 4.9 km || 
|-id=809 bgcolor=#E9E9E9
| 69809 ||  || — || September 14, 1998 || Socorro || LINEAR || MRX || align=right | 3.2 km || 
|-id=810 bgcolor=#E9E9E9
| 69810 ||  || — || September 14, 1998 || Socorro || LINEAR || CLO || align=right | 5.4 km || 
|-id=811 bgcolor=#d6d6d6
| 69811 ||  || — || September 14, 1998 || Socorro || LINEAR || FIR || align=right | 7.4 km || 
|-id=812 bgcolor=#d6d6d6
| 69812 ||  || — || September 14, 1998 || Socorro || LINEAR || — || align=right | 3.9 km || 
|-id=813 bgcolor=#E9E9E9
| 69813 ||  || — || September 14, 1998 || Socorro || LINEAR || AGN || align=right | 3.3 km || 
|-id=814 bgcolor=#E9E9E9
| 69814 ||  || — || September 14, 1998 || Socorro || LINEAR || — || align=right | 3.5 km || 
|-id=815 bgcolor=#d6d6d6
| 69815 ||  || — || September 14, 1998 || Socorro || LINEAR || — || align=right | 6.8 km || 
|-id=816 bgcolor=#E9E9E9
| 69816 ||  || — || September 14, 1998 || Socorro || LINEAR || GEF || align=right | 3.6 km || 
|-id=817 bgcolor=#d6d6d6
| 69817 ||  || — || September 14, 1998 || Socorro || LINEAR || — || align=right | 3.1 km || 
|-id=818 bgcolor=#E9E9E9
| 69818 ||  || — || September 14, 1998 || Socorro || LINEAR || — || align=right | 6.5 km || 
|-id=819 bgcolor=#E9E9E9
| 69819 ||  || — || September 14, 1998 || Socorro || LINEAR || — || align=right | 6.0 km || 
|-id=820 bgcolor=#E9E9E9
| 69820 ||  || — || September 14, 1998 || Socorro || LINEAR || — || align=right | 3.3 km || 
|-id=821 bgcolor=#d6d6d6
| 69821 ||  || — || September 14, 1998 || Socorro || LINEAR || KOR || align=right | 3.5 km || 
|-id=822 bgcolor=#d6d6d6
| 69822 ||  || — || September 14, 1998 || Socorro || LINEAR || — || align=right | 3.3 km || 
|-id=823 bgcolor=#d6d6d6
| 69823 ||  || — || September 14, 1998 || Socorro || LINEAR || KOR || align=right | 3.9 km || 
|-id=824 bgcolor=#E9E9E9
| 69824 ||  || — || September 14, 1998 || Socorro || LINEAR || GEF || align=right | 4.1 km || 
|-id=825 bgcolor=#d6d6d6
| 69825 ||  || — || September 14, 1998 || Socorro || LINEAR || KOR || align=right | 5.9 km || 
|-id=826 bgcolor=#d6d6d6
| 69826 ||  || — || September 14, 1998 || Socorro || LINEAR || — || align=right | 5.5 km || 
|-id=827 bgcolor=#d6d6d6
| 69827 ||  || — || September 14, 1998 || Socorro || LINEAR || KOR || align=right | 4.9 km || 
|-id=828 bgcolor=#d6d6d6
| 69828 ||  || — || September 14, 1998 || Socorro || LINEAR || — || align=right | 6.0 km || 
|-id=829 bgcolor=#E9E9E9
| 69829 ||  || — || September 14, 1998 || Socorro || LINEAR || GEF || align=right | 4.6 km || 
|-id=830 bgcolor=#E9E9E9
| 69830 ||  || — || September 14, 1998 || Socorro || LINEAR || — || align=right | 5.0 km || 
|-id=831 bgcolor=#d6d6d6
| 69831 ||  || — || September 14, 1998 || Socorro || LINEAR || CHA || align=right | 5.4 km || 
|-id=832 bgcolor=#E9E9E9
| 69832 ||  || — || September 14, 1998 || Socorro || LINEAR || — || align=right | 5.5 km || 
|-id=833 bgcolor=#d6d6d6
| 69833 ||  || — || September 14, 1998 || Socorro || LINEAR || — || align=right | 4.2 km || 
|-id=834 bgcolor=#d6d6d6
| 69834 ||  || — || September 14, 1998 || Socorro || LINEAR || — || align=right | 4.9 km || 
|-id=835 bgcolor=#E9E9E9
| 69835 ||  || — || September 14, 1998 || Socorro || LINEAR || — || align=right | 6.5 km || 
|-id=836 bgcolor=#E9E9E9
| 69836 ||  || — || September 18, 1998 || Goodricke-Pigott || R. A. Tucker || — || align=right | 5.0 km || 
|-id=837 bgcolor=#d6d6d6
| 69837 ||  || — || September 19, 1998 || Prescott || P. G. Comba || EOS || align=right | 6.5 km || 
|-id=838 bgcolor=#E9E9E9
| 69838 ||  || — || September 20, 1998 || Kitt Peak || Spacewatch || — || align=right | 3.1 km || 
|-id=839 bgcolor=#d6d6d6
| 69839 ||  || — || September 18, 1998 || Caussols || ODAS || — || align=right | 5.5 km || 
|-id=840 bgcolor=#d6d6d6
| 69840 ||  || — || September 16, 1998 || Uenohara || N. Kawasato || — || align=right | 9.3 km || 
|-id=841 bgcolor=#d6d6d6
| 69841 ||  || — || September 22, 1998 || Caussols || ODAS || — || align=right | 3.9 km || 
|-id=842 bgcolor=#d6d6d6
| 69842 ||  || — || September 20, 1998 || Kitt Peak || Spacewatch || — || align=right | 5.9 km || 
|-id=843 bgcolor=#d6d6d6
| 69843 ||  || — || September 23, 1998 || Višnjan Observatory || Višnjan Obs. || KOR || align=right | 3.3 km || 
|-id=844 bgcolor=#d6d6d6
| 69844 ||  || — || September 23, 1998 || Woomera || F. B. Zoltowski || EOS || align=right | 4.7 km || 
|-id=845 bgcolor=#d6d6d6
| 69845 ||  || — || September 24, 1998 || Ondřejov || P. Pravec || — || align=right | 11 km || 
|-id=846 bgcolor=#E9E9E9
| 69846 ||  || — || September 23, 1998 || Kitt Peak || Spacewatch || — || align=right | 4.9 km || 
|-id=847 bgcolor=#fefefe
| 69847 ||  || — || September 26, 1998 || Socorro || LINEAR || H || align=right | 1.4 km || 
|-id=848 bgcolor=#d6d6d6
| 69848 ||  || — || September 22, 1998 || Caussols || ODAS || — || align=right | 11 km || 
|-id=849 bgcolor=#d6d6d6
| 69849 ||  || — || September 23, 1998 || Kitt Peak || Spacewatch || — || align=right | 3.4 km || 
|-id=850 bgcolor=#d6d6d6
| 69850 ||  || — || September 24, 1998 || Kitt Peak || Spacewatch || CHA || align=right | 5.6 km || 
|-id=851 bgcolor=#d6d6d6
| 69851 ||  || — || September 25, 1998 || Kitt Peak || Spacewatch || — || align=right | 7.1 km || 
|-id=852 bgcolor=#d6d6d6
| 69852 ||  || — || September 26, 1998 || Kitt Peak || Spacewatch || THM || align=right | 4.1 km || 
|-id=853 bgcolor=#d6d6d6
| 69853 ||  || — || September 16, 1998 || Anderson Mesa || LONEOS || 628 || align=right | 7.5 km || 
|-id=854 bgcolor=#d6d6d6
| 69854 ||  || — || September 16, 1998 || Anderson Mesa || LONEOS || — || align=right | 6.5 km || 
|-id=855 bgcolor=#E9E9E9
| 69855 ||  || — || September 16, 1998 || Anderson Mesa || LONEOS || — || align=right | 3.7 km || 
|-id=856 bgcolor=#d6d6d6
| 69856 ||  || — || September 17, 1998 || Anderson Mesa || LONEOS || KOR || align=right | 3.7 km || 
|-id=857 bgcolor=#d6d6d6
| 69857 ||  || — || September 17, 1998 || Anderson Mesa || LONEOS || KOR || align=right | 3.9 km || 
|-id=858 bgcolor=#d6d6d6
| 69858 ||  || — || September 17, 1998 || Anderson Mesa || LONEOS || — || align=right | 4.7 km || 
|-id=859 bgcolor=#d6d6d6
| 69859 ||  || — || September 17, 1998 || Anderson Mesa || LONEOS || — || align=right | 7.5 km || 
|-id=860 bgcolor=#E9E9E9
| 69860 ||  || — || September 17, 1998 || Anderson Mesa || LONEOS || — || align=right | 4.9 km || 
|-id=861 bgcolor=#d6d6d6
| 69861 ||  || — || September 17, 1998 || Anderson Mesa || LONEOS || EOS || align=right | 5.3 km || 
|-id=862 bgcolor=#d6d6d6
| 69862 ||  || — || September 17, 1998 || Anderson Mesa || LONEOS || — || align=right | 7.5 km || 
|-id=863 bgcolor=#d6d6d6
| 69863 ||  || — || September 17, 1998 || Anderson Mesa || LONEOS || KOR || align=right | 4.6 km || 
|-id=864 bgcolor=#E9E9E9
| 69864 ||  || — || September 17, 1998 || Anderson Mesa || LONEOS || — || align=right | 6.3 km || 
|-id=865 bgcolor=#d6d6d6
| 69865 ||  || — || September 17, 1998 || Anderson Mesa || LONEOS || — || align=right | 5.5 km || 
|-id=866 bgcolor=#d6d6d6
| 69866 ||  || — || September 17, 1998 || Anderson Mesa || LONEOS || KOR || align=right | 3.8 km || 
|-id=867 bgcolor=#d6d6d6
| 69867 ||  || — || September 17, 1998 || Anderson Mesa || LONEOS || KOR || align=right | 3.7 km || 
|-id=868 bgcolor=#d6d6d6
| 69868 ||  || — || September 17, 1998 || Anderson Mesa || LONEOS || — || align=right | 5.4 km || 
|-id=869 bgcolor=#d6d6d6
| 69869 Haining ||  ||  || September 25, 1998 || Xinglong || SCAP || — || align=right | 9.6 km || 
|-id=870 bgcolor=#d6d6d6
| 69870 Fizeau ||  ||  || September 20, 1998 || La Silla || E. W. Elst || — || align=right | 8.3 km || 
|-id=871 bgcolor=#d6d6d6
| 69871 ||  || — || September 20, 1998 || La Silla || E. W. Elst || — || align=right | 6.4 km || 
|-id=872 bgcolor=#d6d6d6
| 69872 ||  || — || September 21, 1998 || La Silla || E. W. Elst || EOS || align=right | 6.2 km || 
|-id=873 bgcolor=#d6d6d6
| 69873 ||  || — || September 21, 1998 || La Silla || E. W. Elst || EOS || align=right | 8.1 km || 
|-id=874 bgcolor=#d6d6d6
| 69874 ||  || — || September 21, 1998 || La Silla || E. W. Elst || — || align=right | 6.9 km || 
|-id=875 bgcolor=#d6d6d6
| 69875 ||  || — || September 21, 1998 || La Silla || E. W. Elst || — || align=right | 3.3 km || 
|-id=876 bgcolor=#d6d6d6
| 69876 ||  || — || September 21, 1998 || La Silla || E. W. Elst || HYG || align=right | 6.5 km || 
|-id=877 bgcolor=#d6d6d6
| 69877 ||  || — || September 26, 1998 || Socorro || LINEAR || — || align=right | 5.1 km || 
|-id=878 bgcolor=#E9E9E9
| 69878 ||  || — || September 26, 1998 || Socorro || LINEAR || — || align=right | 4.7 km || 
|-id=879 bgcolor=#E9E9E9
| 69879 ||  || — || September 26, 1998 || Socorro || LINEAR || — || align=right | 3.9 km || 
|-id=880 bgcolor=#d6d6d6
| 69880 ||  || — || September 26, 1998 || Socorro || LINEAR || KAR || align=right | 4.5 km || 
|-id=881 bgcolor=#d6d6d6
| 69881 ||  || — || September 26, 1998 || Socorro || LINEAR || — || align=right | 5.1 km || 
|-id=882 bgcolor=#d6d6d6
| 69882 ||  || — || September 26, 1998 || Socorro || LINEAR || — || align=right | 7.9 km || 
|-id=883 bgcolor=#d6d6d6
| 69883 ||  || — || September 26, 1998 || Socorro || LINEAR || — || align=right | 6.3 km || 
|-id=884 bgcolor=#d6d6d6
| 69884 ||  || — || September 26, 1998 || Socorro || LINEAR || — || align=right | 5.9 km || 
|-id=885 bgcolor=#d6d6d6
| 69885 ||  || — || September 26, 1998 || Socorro || LINEAR || ALA || align=right | 13 km || 
|-id=886 bgcolor=#d6d6d6
| 69886 ||  || — || September 26, 1998 || Socorro || LINEAR || EOS || align=right | 6.1 km || 
|-id=887 bgcolor=#E9E9E9
| 69887 ||  || — || September 26, 1998 || Socorro || LINEAR || EUN || align=right | 4.0 km || 
|-id=888 bgcolor=#d6d6d6
| 69888 ||  || — || September 26, 1998 || Socorro || LINEAR || — || align=right | 3.5 km || 
|-id=889 bgcolor=#fefefe
| 69889 ||  || — || September 26, 1998 || Socorro || LINEAR || — || align=right | 1.7 km || 
|-id=890 bgcolor=#E9E9E9
| 69890 ||  || — || September 26, 1998 || Socorro || LINEAR || — || align=right | 2.0 km || 
|-id=891 bgcolor=#d6d6d6
| 69891 ||  || — || September 26, 1998 || Socorro || LINEAR || KOR || align=right | 3.8 km || 
|-id=892 bgcolor=#d6d6d6
| 69892 ||  || — || September 26, 1998 || Socorro || LINEAR || EOS || align=right | 7.1 km || 
|-id=893 bgcolor=#d6d6d6
| 69893 ||  || — || September 26, 1998 || Socorro || LINEAR || — || align=right | 5.4 km || 
|-id=894 bgcolor=#d6d6d6
| 69894 ||  || — || September 26, 1998 || Socorro || LINEAR || EOS || align=right | 5.3 km || 
|-id=895 bgcolor=#d6d6d6
| 69895 ||  || — || September 26, 1998 || Socorro || LINEAR || — || align=right | 3.4 km || 
|-id=896 bgcolor=#d6d6d6
| 69896 ||  || — || September 26, 1998 || Socorro || LINEAR || KOR || align=right | 5.0 km || 
|-id=897 bgcolor=#E9E9E9
| 69897 ||  || — || September 26, 1998 || Socorro || LINEAR || — || align=right | 5.2 km || 
|-id=898 bgcolor=#E9E9E9
| 69898 ||  || — || September 26, 1998 || Socorro || LINEAR || GEF || align=right | 4.0 km || 
|-id=899 bgcolor=#d6d6d6
| 69899 ||  || — || September 26, 1998 || Socorro || LINEAR || — || align=right | 5.6 km || 
|-id=900 bgcolor=#d6d6d6
| 69900 ||  || — || September 26, 1998 || Socorro || LINEAR || — || align=right | 3.3 km || 
|}

69901–70000 

|-bgcolor=#d6d6d6
| 69901 ||  || — || September 26, 1998 || Socorro || LINEAR || — || align=right | 5.7 km || 
|-id=902 bgcolor=#d6d6d6
| 69902 ||  || — || September 26, 1998 || Socorro || LINEAR || EOS || align=right | 3.5 km || 
|-id=903 bgcolor=#d6d6d6
| 69903 ||  || — || September 26, 1998 || Socorro || LINEAR || — || align=right | 7.7 km || 
|-id=904 bgcolor=#d6d6d6
| 69904 ||  || — || September 26, 1998 || Socorro || LINEAR || HYG || align=right | 9.0 km || 
|-id=905 bgcolor=#d6d6d6
| 69905 ||  || — || September 20, 1998 || La Silla || E. W. Elst || EOS || align=right | 3.8 km || 
|-id=906 bgcolor=#d6d6d6
| 69906 ||  || — || September 20, 1998 || La Silla || E. W. Elst || — || align=right | 5.9 km || 
|-id=907 bgcolor=#d6d6d6
| 69907 ||  || — || September 20, 1998 || La Silla || E. W. Elst || THM || align=right | 6.6 km || 
|-id=908 bgcolor=#E9E9E9
| 69908 ||  || — || September 26, 1998 || Socorro || LINEAR || HOF || align=right | 6.4 km || 
|-id=909 bgcolor=#d6d6d6
| 69909 ||  || — || September 26, 1998 || Socorro || LINEAR || — || align=right | 5.9 km || 
|-id=910 bgcolor=#d6d6d6
| 69910 ||  || — || September 26, 1998 || Socorro || LINEAR || — || align=right | 5.1 km || 
|-id=911 bgcolor=#d6d6d6
| 69911 ||  || — || September 26, 1998 || Socorro || LINEAR || — || align=right | 5.2 km || 
|-id=912 bgcolor=#d6d6d6
| 69912 ||  || — || September 26, 1998 || Socorro || LINEAR || — || align=right | 5.4 km || 
|-id=913 bgcolor=#d6d6d6
| 69913 ||  || — || September 26, 1998 || Socorro || LINEAR || URS || align=right | 8.3 km || 
|-id=914 bgcolor=#d6d6d6
| 69914 ||  || — || September 26, 1998 || Socorro || LINEAR || — || align=right | 8.5 km || 
|-id=915 bgcolor=#fefefe
| 69915 ||  || — || September 23, 1998 || Catalina || CSS || H || align=right | 1.2 km || 
|-id=916 bgcolor=#E9E9E9
| 69916 ||  || — || September 23, 1998 || Kitt Peak || Spacewatch || — || align=right | 2.9 km || 
|-id=917 bgcolor=#E9E9E9
| 69917 || 1998 TF || — || October 10, 1998 || Oizumi || T. Kobayashi || — || align=right | 12 km || 
|-id=918 bgcolor=#E9E9E9
| 69918 ||  || — || October 15, 1998 || Reedy Creek || J. Broughton || CLO || align=right | 6.5 km || 
|-id=919 bgcolor=#d6d6d6
| 69919 ||  || — || October 12, 1998 || Kitt Peak || Spacewatch || HYG || align=right | 9.5 km || 
|-id=920 bgcolor=#d6d6d6
| 69920 ||  || — || October 12, 1998 || Kitt Peak || Spacewatch || — || align=right | 6.1 km || 
|-id=921 bgcolor=#d6d6d6
| 69921 ||  || — || October 15, 1998 || Xinglong || SCAP || TEL || align=right | 3.6 km || 
|-id=922 bgcolor=#d6d6d6
| 69922 ||  || — || October 13, 1998 || Kitt Peak || Spacewatch || — || align=right | 10 km || 
|-id=923 bgcolor=#d6d6d6
| 69923 ||  || — || October 13, 1998 || Kitt Peak || Spacewatch || — || align=right | 4.6 km || 
|-id=924 bgcolor=#d6d6d6
| 69924 ||  || — || October 13, 1998 || Kitt Peak || Spacewatch || — || align=right | 5.4 km || 
|-id=925 bgcolor=#d6d6d6
| 69925 ||  || — || October 10, 1998 || Anderson Mesa || LONEOS || — || align=right | 6.9 km || 
|-id=926 bgcolor=#d6d6d6
| 69926 ||  || — || October 11, 1998 || Anderson Mesa || LONEOS || — || align=right | 5.3 km || 
|-id=927 bgcolor=#d6d6d6
| 69927 ||  || — || October 11, 1998 || Anderson Mesa || LONEOS || — || align=right | 5.0 km || 
|-id=928 bgcolor=#E9E9E9
| 69928 ||  || — || October 14, 1998 || Anderson Mesa || LONEOS || GEF || align=right | 3.8 km || 
|-id=929 bgcolor=#d6d6d6
| 69929 ||  || — || October 14, 1998 || Anderson Mesa || LONEOS || THM || align=right | 5.8 km || 
|-id=930 bgcolor=#E9E9E9
| 69930 ||  || — || October 14, 1998 || Anderson Mesa || LONEOS || — || align=right | 5.8 km || 
|-id=931 bgcolor=#E9E9E9
| 69931 || 1998 UA || — || October 16, 1998 || Catalina || CSS || PAL || align=right | 6.9 km || 
|-id=932 bgcolor=#d6d6d6
| 69932 || 1998 UK || — || October 16, 1998 || Prescott || P. G. Comba || — || align=right | 5.7 km || 
|-id=933 bgcolor=#d6d6d6
| 69933 ||  || — || October 21, 1998 || Višnjan Observatory || K. Korlević || ALA || align=right | 11 km || 
|-id=934 bgcolor=#d6d6d6
| 69934 ||  || — || October 23, 1998 || Kitt Peak || Spacewatch || KOR || align=right | 3.2 km || 
|-id=935 bgcolor=#fefefe
| 69935 ||  || — || October 27, 1998 || Catalina || CSS || H || align=right | 1.7 km || 
|-id=936 bgcolor=#d6d6d6
| 69936 ||  || — || October 17, 1998 || Xinglong || SCAP || EOS || align=right | 5.5 km || 
|-id=937 bgcolor=#E9E9E9
| 69937 ||  || — || October 28, 1998 || Socorro || LINEAR || GEF || align=right | 3.3 km || 
|-id=938 bgcolor=#E9E9E9
| 69938 ||  || — || October 17, 1998 || Anderson Mesa || LONEOS || — || align=right | 5.6 km || 
|-id=939 bgcolor=#d6d6d6
| 69939 ||  || — || October 18, 1998 || La Silla || E. W. Elst || — || align=right | 11 km || 
|-id=940 bgcolor=#E9E9E9
| 69940 ||  || — || October 18, 1998 || La Silla || E. W. Elst || INO || align=right | 4.2 km || 
|-id=941 bgcolor=#d6d6d6
| 69941 ||  || — || October 18, 1998 || La Silla || E. W. Elst || EOS || align=right | 5.3 km || 
|-id=942 bgcolor=#E9E9E9
| 69942 ||  || — || October 25, 1998 || Kushiro || S. Ueda, H. Kaneda || — || align=right | 8.6 km || 
|-id=943 bgcolor=#d6d6d6
| 69943 ||  || — || October 28, 1998 || Socorro || LINEAR || — || align=right | 6.4 km || 
|-id=944 bgcolor=#d6d6d6
| 69944 ||  || — || October 28, 1998 || Socorro || LINEAR || — || align=right | 5.8 km || 
|-id=945 bgcolor=#E9E9E9
| 69945 ||  || — || October 28, 1998 || Socorro || LINEAR || — || align=right | 6.6 km || 
|-id=946 bgcolor=#d6d6d6
| 69946 ||  || — || October 28, 1998 || Socorro || LINEAR || — || align=right | 4.9 km || 
|-id=947 bgcolor=#d6d6d6
| 69947 ||  || — || October 20, 1998 || Anderson Mesa || LONEOS || VER || align=right | 7.0 km || 
|-id=948 bgcolor=#d6d6d6
| 69948 ||  || — || November 9, 1998 || Caussols || ODAS || — || align=right | 3.1 km || 
|-id=949 bgcolor=#d6d6d6
| 69949 ||  || — || November 11, 1998 || Caussols || ODAS || — || align=right | 8.3 km || 
|-id=950 bgcolor=#d6d6d6
| 69950 ||  || — || November 12, 1998 || Ondřejov || L. Kotková || — || align=right | 8.5 km || 
|-id=951 bgcolor=#E9E9E9
| 69951 ||  || — || November 11, 1998 || Nachi-Katsuura || Y. Shimizu, T. Urata || — || align=right | 5.4 km || 
|-id=952 bgcolor=#d6d6d6
| 69952 ||  || — || November 10, 1998 || Socorro || LINEAR || THM || align=right | 6.0 km || 
|-id=953 bgcolor=#E9E9E9
| 69953 ||  || — || November 10, 1998 || Socorro || LINEAR || GEF || align=right | 3.3 km || 
|-id=954 bgcolor=#d6d6d6
| 69954 ||  || — || November 10, 1998 || Socorro || LINEAR || — || align=right | 6.7 km || 
|-id=955 bgcolor=#d6d6d6
| 69955 ||  || — || November 10, 1998 || Socorro || LINEAR || — || align=right | 13 km || 
|-id=956 bgcolor=#d6d6d6
| 69956 ||  || — || November 10, 1998 || Socorro || LINEAR || — || align=right | 4.9 km || 
|-id=957 bgcolor=#E9E9E9
| 69957 ||  || — || November 10, 1998 || Socorro || LINEAR || — || align=right | 4.2 km || 
|-id=958 bgcolor=#d6d6d6
| 69958 ||  || — || November 10, 1998 || Socorro || LINEAR || — || align=right | 7.6 km || 
|-id=959 bgcolor=#d6d6d6
| 69959 ||  || — || November 14, 1998 || Oizumi || T. Kobayashi || AEG || align=right | 8.2 km || 
|-id=960 bgcolor=#d6d6d6
| 69960 ||  || — || November 11, 1998 || Višnjan Observatory || K. Korlević || — || align=right | 7.8 km || 
|-id=961 bgcolor=#fefefe
| 69961 Millosevich ||  ||  || November 15, 1998 || Sormano || P. Sicoli, F. Manca || H || align=right | 1.3 km || 
|-id=962 bgcolor=#E9E9E9
| 69962 ||  || — || November 12, 1998 || Kushiro || S. Ueda, H. Kaneda || CLO || align=right | 7.2 km || 
|-id=963 bgcolor=#E9E9E9
| 69963 ||  || — || November 4, 1998 || Xinglong || SCAP || GEF || align=right | 4.6 km || 
|-id=964 bgcolor=#d6d6d6
| 69964 ||  || — || November 14, 1998 || Socorro || LINEAR || — || align=right | 6.6 km || 
|-id=965 bgcolor=#d6d6d6
| 69965 ||  || — || November 14, 1998 || Kitt Peak || Spacewatch || KOR || align=right | 3.1 km || 
|-id=966 bgcolor=#E9E9E9
| 69966 ||  || — || November 15, 1998 || Anderson Mesa || LONEOS || EUN || align=right | 4.3 km || 
|-id=967 bgcolor=#d6d6d6
| 69967 ||  || — || November 11, 1998 || Socorro || LINEAR || — || align=right | 6.2 km || 
|-id=968 bgcolor=#d6d6d6
| 69968 ||  || — || November 13, 1998 || Socorro || LINEAR || URS || align=right | 5.2 km || 
|-id=969 bgcolor=#d6d6d6
| 69969 ||  || — || November 14, 1998 || Socorro || LINEAR || — || align=right | 10 km || 
|-id=970 bgcolor=#d6d6d6
| 69970 || 1998 WV || — || November 17, 1998 || Oizumi || T. Kobayashi || — || align=right | 8.7 km || 
|-id=971 bgcolor=#d6d6d6
| 69971 Tanzi ||  ||  || November 18, 1998 || Sormano || M. Cavagna || — || align=right | 13 km || 
|-id=972 bgcolor=#d6d6d6
| 69972 ||  || — || November 19, 1998 || Farra d'Isonzo || Farra d'Isonzo || — || align=right | 4.6 km || 
|-id=973 bgcolor=#fefefe
| 69973 ||  || — || November 17, 1998 || Catalina || CSS || H || align=right | 1.3 km || 
|-id=974 bgcolor=#d6d6d6
| 69974 ||  || — || November 18, 1998 || Catalina || CSS || — || align=right | 9.1 km || 
|-id=975 bgcolor=#E9E9E9
| 69975 ||  || — || November 17, 1998 || Dossobuono || L. Lai || INO || align=right | 3.1 km || 
|-id=976 bgcolor=#d6d6d6
| 69976 ||  || — || November 18, 1998 || Kushiro || S. Ueda, H. Kaneda || — || align=right | 8.1 km || 
|-id=977 bgcolor=#d6d6d6
| 69977 Saurodonati ||  ||  || November 28, 1998 || Monte Agliale || E. Mazzoni, M. Ziboli || — || align=right | 7.0 km || 
|-id=978 bgcolor=#d6d6d6
| 69978 ||  || — || November 21, 1998 || Socorro || LINEAR || HYG || align=right | 3.5 km || 
|-id=979 bgcolor=#d6d6d6
| 69979 ||  || — || November 21, 1998 || Socorro || LINEAR || THM || align=right | 5.5 km || 
|-id=980 bgcolor=#d6d6d6
| 69980 ||  || — || November 21, 1998 || Socorro || LINEAR || URS || align=right | 13 km || 
|-id=981 bgcolor=#d6d6d6
| 69981 ||  || — || November 21, 1998 || Socorro || LINEAR || HYG || align=right | 7.0 km || 
|-id=982 bgcolor=#d6d6d6
| 69982 ||  || — || November 21, 1998 || Socorro || LINEAR || — || align=right | 5.1 km || 
|-id=983 bgcolor=#d6d6d6
| 69983 ||  || — || November 21, 1998 || Socorro || LINEAR || ALA || align=right | 9.9 km || 
|-id=984 bgcolor=#d6d6d6
| 69984 ||  || — || November 21, 1998 || Socorro || LINEAR || — || align=right | 5.1 km || 
|-id=985 bgcolor=#d6d6d6
| 69985 ||  || — || November 18, 1998 || Socorro || LINEAR || — || align=right | 7.9 km || 
|-id=986 bgcolor=#C2E0FF
| 69986 ||  || — || November 18, 1998 || Kitt Peak || M. W. Buie || plutino || align=right | 97 km || 
|-id=987 bgcolor=#C2E0FF
| 69987 ||  || — || November 19, 1998 || Kitt Peak || M. W. Buie || cubewano (cold)critical || align=right | 168 km || 
|-id=988 bgcolor=#C2E0FF
| 69988 ||  || — || November 18, 1998 || Kitt Peak || M. W. Buie || res2:5critical || align=right | 147 km || 
|-id=989 bgcolor=#d6d6d6
| 69989 ||  || — || November 19, 1998 || Anderson Mesa || LONEOS || — || align=right | 5.0 km || 
|-id=990 bgcolor=#C2E0FF
| 69990 ||  || — || November 18, 1998 || Kitt Peak || M. W. Buie || plutino || align=right | 106 km || 
|-id=991 bgcolor=#d6d6d6
| 69991 ||  || — || November 19, 1998 || Anderson Mesa || LONEOS || — || align=right | 6.6 km || 
|-id=992 bgcolor=#d6d6d6
| 69992 ||  || — || November 20, 1998 || Anderson Mesa || LONEOS || — || align=right | 9.1 km || 
|-id=993 bgcolor=#d6d6d6
| 69993 ||  || — || November 21, 1998 || Kitt Peak || Spacewatch || — || align=right | 8.2 km || 
|-id=994 bgcolor=#d6d6d6
| 69994 ||  || — || November 21, 1998 || Kitt Peak || Spacewatch || — || align=right | 6.8 km || 
|-id=995 bgcolor=#d6d6d6
| 69995 ||  || — || November 21, 1998 || Kitt Peak || Spacewatch || — || align=right | 4.8 km || 
|-id=996 bgcolor=#d6d6d6
| 69996 ||  || — || November 18, 1998 || Socorro || LINEAR || EOS || align=right | 5.7 km || 
|-id=997 bgcolor=#d6d6d6
| 69997 ||  || — || November 18, 1998 || Socorro || LINEAR || — || align=right | 8.5 km || 
|-id=998 bgcolor=#d6d6d6
| 69998 || 1998 XD || — || December 1, 1998 || Xinglong || SCAP || — || align=right | 5.8 km || 
|-id=999 bgcolor=#d6d6d6
| 69999 || 1998 XN || — || December 9, 1998 || Kleť || Kleť Obs. || 7:4 || align=right | 8.6 km || 
|-id=000 bgcolor=#d6d6d6
| 70000 ||  || — || December 8, 1998 || Kitt Peak || Spacewatch || THM || align=right | 5.8 km || 
|}

References

External links 
 Discovery Circumstances: Numbered Minor Planets (65001)–(70000) (IAU Minor Planet Center)

0069